Orange Is the New Black is an American comedy-drama series, created by Jenji Kohan and airing on Netflix. Set in the fictional Litchfield Correctional Facility, a women's Federal prison, it has featured a diverse ensemble of recurring or minor characters - including inmates, prison guards and staff, and non-prison characters. Many of these characters are expanded upon through a series of flashbacks told over the course of an episode, or over the course of the series. Many are subsequently upgraded to main characters as their roles are expanded and they feature more prominently in storylines.

Litchfield inmates

Sophia Burset
Sophia Burset (played by Laverne Cox; portrayed by M Lamar in pre-transition flashbacks) – A trans woman, formerly a firefighter named Marcus, Sophia is in prison for credit card fraud, which she used to finance her sex reassignment surgery. Her wife at the time, Crystal, had been supportive of her transition and even helped her during her adjustment period, but her young son, Michael, had difficulty with her transition and ultimately turned her in to authorities.

In the prison, she works as a hairdresser and spends the first half of the first season railing against a reduction in her hormone dosage, which is stated to be over concerns about liver damage, but she is convinced it is discrimination (in fact, it is hinted at being due to Figueroa's embezzlement). She becomes a friend of Sister Ingalls, originally in an attempt to convince the nun to give her some of her hormones. Ingalls convinces her to try to reconcile with her son, and also to let Crystal move on.

Sophia is kind and understanding, albeit a little stubborn. Early on, she trades with Piper for a lock of hair, in return for some cocoa butter Piper needs to create her lotion for Red. They later develop an amicable relationship, often trading gifts or advice. She, like Piper, also seems to be more educated than many of her fellow inmates, being concerned about issues such as healthcare and benefits.

During the second season, she is shown being visited by her son in prison for the first time, and they are seen making amends. Sophia also develops friendships with Red, who goes to her for a makeover when she learns Vee has returned, and surprisingly, Tiffany, who has mellowed out considerably.

During the third season, Sophia agrees to allow Gloria's son to ride with her son for weekly visits. The two start a friendship that results in her son acting out, causing Sophia to rescind her offer and cause a rift between Gloria and her that culminated into a violent confrontation. She later finds out that her son was the instigator of a violent attack on another child, but refuses to apologize to Gloria. Sophia ends up being attacked by other inmates in her beauty salon, during which the CO on duty runs away to fetch Caputo rather than intervening herself. Sophia tells Caputo that she is willing to bring a lawsuit against the prison if they don't take appropriate measures. When this is reported to MCC, they respond by throwing Sophia in the SHU claiming it is for her protection, when in reality she is being punished for her threat to sue.

In the fourth season, Sophia spends most of the season in the SHU, and makes numerous efforts to get Caputo's attention, such as flooding her cell, setting fires, and bashing her head against the walls of her cell, while Crystal, with Gloria's secret assistance, repeatedly confronted him at the prison and his house. Eventually, she is released from the SHU when Caputo uses Jane's smuggled phone to take a picture of her and leaks the picture to Danny Pearson. Upon her release from the SHU, she initially rebuffs Gloria's attempts to make amends but eventually warms to her when she helps her fix her wig, which had been damaged in the previous season.

In the fifth season, she uses her basic medical training from her firefighting days to stitch CO Humphrey's gunshot wound and spends most of the season helping the prison's only remaining medical personnel - one of the nurses - to care for the sick and injured inmates. Eventually, Sophia sneaks out of the prison with the intent to get sent to max to find Jane but discovers that she has been released on compassionate grounds.

She returns, minus her wig, in the sixth season and lives in "Florida," the neutral B block of Litchfield Max and rebuilds her friendship with Gloria. Later in the season, Caputo, who quit his job in disgust due to MCC's recent tactics, tries to convince Sophia to pursue them in court in an effort to direct negative publicity towards MCC for the time she spent in solitary and potentially help Taystee in her murder trial. She initially agrees, but later changes her mind after Linda Ferguson offered her a settlement agreement of $300,000 and an immediate release from prison in exchange for not filing a lawsuit against them. She is released alongside Piper at the end of the season.

Sophia makes a brief appearance in the seventh season, when she runs into Piper at the probation office and it is revealed that they share the same probation officer. It is revealed that she now has her own hair salon business. She does Piper's hair as a favor while encouraging her to leave prison behind and move forward.

Janae Watson
Janae Watson (played by Vicky Jeudy; portrayed by Journee Brown in flashbacks) – A gifted former high school track star who was arrested after she became involved with a criminal boyfriend and was caught robbing a check-cashing establishment. She is one of the younger inmates. Flashbacks reveal that her downward spiral was mostly her own fault, as her boyfriend's superior, the local gang leader, had made numerous efforts to persuade her to stay out of the criminal life, and to take advantage of her track scholarship, including ejecting her from his parties. She is initially very rude and standoffish toward Piper and has problems with authority, confronting Miss Claudette and the prison guards. Janae is assigned to the tool crib in the electrical shop and loses a screwdriver on her first day. After refusing to be searched by a male prison guard, Janae is sent to the SHU by Caputo. She blames Piper for this since Piper lost the screwdriver that started the whole confrontation. Piper is able to make it up to her later by convincing the prison to reopen the running track so that Janae can run again. After getting out of SHU, Janae takes out her anger on Yoga Jones, who slaps her in the face after a confrontation when Janae mocks her about why she is in prison. However, they later talk it out and are able to form a trusting relationship.

In the second season, she joins Vee's gang as she gets a cut of the cigarette money. She is sent down to SHU again after being caught with the cigarettes in her bunk. She is visibly affected by her second time in the SHU, and once again her relationship with Yoga Jones becomes strained when she rejects Yoga Jones' compassion. Later, she is convinced by Vee to pin Red's beating on Suzanne, but has a change of heart and attempts to recant her testimony along with Black Cindy.

During the third season, she is shown working on the lingerie detail with several of the other inmates. She is the only member of her group to object to allowing Brook to join their group after her suicide attempt. In flashbacks, it is shown that she was raised in an observant Muslim household. Upon receiving her track scholarship for college, her father forbade her from running track due to her uniform not being modest enough and going against their Muslim faith. In their subsequent argument, her hint that she would renounce Islam resulted in a slap from her father.

During the fourth season, she tries to help Black Cindy get a picture of Judy King to sell to the paparazzi. Later, the day after Poussey died, she punched Kasey in the face after she overhears her making a disrespectful remark about Poussey when her body is being removed from the prison.

At the end of the fourth season, she joins in the riot after Poussey's death.

During the fifth season, she stayed by Taystee's side while she was preparing to take the lead in negotiating to end the riot. When Taystee decided to force Judy to make a statement on behalf of the prisoners, she objected due to Judy being given special treatment during her sentence as a result of her wealth and fame. She was pleased when Taystee prevented Judy from giving the statement at the last minute and gave it herself and cheered her on when she was negotiating with Figueroa. Later on, she is faced with the task of helping her friends deal with Suzanne, and was trying to help wake her up prior to the CERT (Correctional Emergency Response Team) officers breaking into the prison. She ended up being one of the first inmates detained and is left unsure of the whereabouts of her friends when the prison buses are arriving and they aren't among the rest of the inmates. After this, she is loaded on the buses and doesn't appear in the sixth season.

She appears briefly in the series finale, continuing her running at the prison to which Alex is sent.

Yoga Jones
Yoga Jones (played by Constance Shulman) is an inmate who teaches yoga. She has an unusually calm, peaceful demeanor, completely out of place in the prison environment, and as such gives no indication about why she might be in prison. Her calmness shatters, however, when she has a fight with an angry Janae, who deduces that her commitment to spirituality and yoga stems from her having committed a particularly heinous crime, and cruelly suggests that she may have killed a child — leading to Jones snapping and hitting her across the face. Later, while the two are working in the rec room, Jones explains that while she was a marijuana farmer in California, she accidentally shot and killed an 8-year-old boy she mistook for a deer, and is therefore in prison for manslaughter. Watson realizes, as she had thought, that Jones is indeed using her yoga and commitment to spirituality to cope with the intense emotional pain and guilt that she feels as a result of her crime.

During the second season, she is seen participating in a hunger strike with Brook, to protest prison conditions. This is also her attempt to protest Janae having been thrown in the SHU, but her efforts are met with indifference by Janae herself, who coldly rebuffs her.

During the fourth season, she is selected to be Judy King's roommate after she gets a private cell. She frequently criticizes Judy's special treatment, while not completely abstaining from some of the benefits. When Aydin's remains are found, she ends up having a threesome with Judy and Luschek while high on Ecstasy. When she discovers that Judy is being released early due to Poussey's death, she tries to convince her to either refuse to leave in protest or to inform the media of the circumstances of Poussey's death.

In the fifth season, she along with Anita DeMarco join the white supremacists in order to capture Judy. They held her due to the belief she was receiving a supply drop by helicopter, but it turned out to be the press instead. After Judy is sold to Black Cindy and her friends, she plays a minimal part in the riot and is invited to Freida's bunker. At the conclusion of the fifth season, she eventually surrenders to the CERT members along with Anita DeMarco, Norma Romano, and Gina Murphy. After she was captured, she was transferred and does not appear in the sixth season.

She appears in the series finale at the Ohio prison, encouraging new inmates to be positive (saying the same thing she had said to Piper when Piper first came).
 Her basis was the book character Yoga Janet, known in real life as Carol Soto; Soto spoke publicly at Quinnipiac University.

Brook Soso
Brook Soso (played by Kimiko Glenn; portrayed by Ella Hampton in flashbacks) – A younger inmate of Japanese and Scottish descent who first appeared in the second season, and landed in prison due to political activism. Chatty and somewhat ditzy, Brook attempts to befriend a non-reciprocating Piper, who had been kind to Brook on her first night in prison. Brook assumes that Piper wants to be friends due to her kind treatment, but finds out it was a ruse when she attempts to sell Brook out to Big Boo to get her blanket back. Later, Brook has sex with Nicky as part of Nicky's sex game with Big Boo, but manages to annoy her by constantly talking during the entire experience. Due to her initial refusal to shower, she annoys many of the inmates and is eventually ordered to be forcibly showered by Figeroa. In response to the prison's cruel treatment, she attempts to stage a hunger strike, which inspires others to join her cause.

In the third season, she attempts to join a group led by Norma but is pushed away by Leanne, who then starts bullying her. Feeling that she was suffering from depression, Healy attempts to prescribe her antidepressants, but this is dismissed by her new counselor Berdie Rogers. After Rogers is suspended, Healy refers her to a doctor to see if a prescription is necessary. During her evaluation, she steals a handful of pills — later discovered to be Benadryl — and attempts to overdose on them. Brook is saved by Poussey, Suzanne, and Taystee, who look after her while she recovers and subsequently takes her into the African-American gang, with the approval of Black Cindy and the reluctant approval of Janae. Following her suicide attempt, she tells Healy that she feels that he is horrible at his job and that he just makes her feel worse whenever they talk.

In the fourth season, Brook starts dating Poussey, but their relationship gets off to a rocky start when she makes inadvertently racist assumptions about her (believing her to have been poor and the daughter of a crack addict). During a flashback, when she was participating in a door to door petition to prevent a Walmart from being built in her neighborhood, she made a bet with her ex-boyfriend that she could get a registered sex offender in their neighborhood to sign her petition. After she discovered that the sex offender had to register because he was caught having consensual sex on an empty public beach by another man recording the encounter, she told her ex-boyfriend that he was a child molester that harassed her during her visit to garner sympathy. Eventually, Brook and Poussey form a loving romance, but their romance is abruptly ended due to Poussey's untimely death. The grieving Brook subsequently saves Suzanne's life after she pulls some bookcases on top of herself in the library.

During the fifth season, it's clear that grief has replaced Brook's upbeat, optimistic personality with reserved and cynical manners. Seeing this, Janae has a heart-to-heart with Brook, who admits that it is anger, rather than sadness that she feels at Poussey's death, and helps her channel her anger by taking her running and giving her boxing lessons. Their shared resentment and anger cause Brook and Taystee to clash, particularly over how Brook chooses to mourn Poussey, but they eventually make their peace over the new memorial library that Brook sets up in the prison corridors.

At the end of the fifth season, Brook passively resists the CERT officers breaking up the riot by sitting in the middle of Poussey's memorial on her own and refuses to move when ordered to. Eventually, she has to be physically picked up and carried out by two officers as she watches them destroy Poussey's memorial library. She is last seen boarding one of the buses transporting the prisoners away after the riot, and it is later revealed that she was transferred to Ohio. She briefly appears in the series finale, in which she is initially seen wandering alone in the exercise yard. Her walk is interrupted by Kasey Sankey, who flirts with her and serenades her with a haiku she wrote. Although she has to gently scold her for calling her an offensive term, as she is still learning not to do so, Brook seems charmed by her effort and reciprocates.

Gina Murphy
Gina Murphy (played by Abigail Savage) – A member of Red's crew in the prison kitchen, it is implied that she was incarcerated for murder and embezzlement. She is often seen with Norma Romano. When Red's scheme to sabotage Gloria backfires, Gina's arm is set on fire when an oven which Red had sabotaged explodes in flame.

During the second season, she is seen with shorter hair, several severe burn marks on the side of her neck, and a more sullen demeanor. She angrily rebuffs several of Red's attempts to win back her friendship but eventually forgives her when Red finally realizes that she hasn't given her the one thing she was looking for, an apology. Later, she notices Nichols contemplating taking a hit of heroin that she got from Vee's gang and harasses her about it for days, eventually pressuring her to take the heroin to Red.

During the third season, she joins Norma's Cult and also escapes to the lake with all the inmates of Litchfield except Piper, Alex, and Lolly. She plays a minimal role in the fourth season, although she helps Luschek prepare the new houses for the new guards. She is shown once again to be quite knowledgeable about household repair skills such as wiring, lighting, and plumbing. Later, she cuts herself by accident and Donuts takes her to medical.

In the fifth season, she helps restore order to the riot by turning off the alarm but accidentally turns off all of the power in the prison in the process. She isn't seen much for the middle of the riot but is invited to Freida's bunker. Later, she witnesses C.O Piscatella torture Red and Alex and she records a video of it and posts it online. She (along with Norma) surrender at the end of the season to the guards.

She is removed from Litchfield after the riot and doesn't appear in the sixth season. However, the footage she filmed of Piscatella torturing Red later helps Piper avoid being charged with his murder.

Sister Ingalls
Sister Jane Ingalls (played by Beth Fowler; portrayed by Aubrey Sinn in flashbacks) – She is a former nun who is in prison for chaining herself in place at a nuclear facility during a protest, and she helps with services in the prison chapel. When Sophia finds out she is getting hormone pills, she tries to cozy up to her to obtain some. Instead, she tries to convince Sophia to reconnect with her son.

In line with her faith, Jane accepts Sophia as a close friend and strongly disliked Tiffany's religious fundamentalism during the first season. She is shown to be rather modernistic and "hip" in her faith and views, and can be very blunt and angry when she needs to be.

The second season reveals her past as a nun who first became an activist during the Vietnam War, but seemed more interested in her fame than doing genuine good works. It is revealed that she was dismissed from her order by the Catholic Church for her actions, but that she has neglected to tell any of the other inmates. After joining Brook's hunger strike, Jane gets carried away and takes over, cutting out Leanne and Angie, before being hospitalized. After the incident, a number of nuns gather at the prison and stage a sit-in while Caputo tries desperately to negotiate with Jane. She only relents after reaching an agreement with Red in the prison hospital—she would eat, but only if Red told the truth about the attack against her.

In the third season, she is one of the inmates that pretends to be Jewish in an effort to gain Kosher meals and was able to convince a rabbi who was screening the "Jewish" women for possible fakers that she was really Jewish, since her Christian teaching gave her enough knowledge of the Jewish faith to be able to persuade him.

During the fourth season, she devises a plan to get sent to the SHU in order to use a smuggled cell phone to take a picture of Sophia and smuggle it to the outside, eventually slapping Gloria in the cafeteria in front of a guard. On her way to the shower, the phone fell out of her vagina and Caputo reprimands her for possessing it, but then Caputo himself takes the picture and smuggles it out of the prison, resulting in Sophia's release from the SHU.

During the fifth season, when Sophia attempts to visit her by getting herself sent to max, it is revealed that Ingalls has been released on compassionate grounds.

Norma Romano
Norma Romano (played by Annie Golden; portrayed by Kristin Parker in flashbacks) – Norma is a member of Red's crew who refuses to speak due to insecurity, as she has a severe stutter (revealed in flashbacks). She works in the prison kitchen, and a flashback reveals that she was the first inmate Red interacted with upon her own arrival. She is often seen with Gina Murphy, as the two of them work in the kitchens together and cater to all of Red's needs.

In the first-season finale, Romano steals the show at the Christmas pageant, revealing a beautiful singing voice. After Red's attempt to sabotage Gloria hurts Gina, Norma expresses frustration and angrily storms away from Red, leaving her in tears. She and Red eventually reconcile, and she attempts to create arsenic to kill Vee after Red's beating. Gloria convinces her that it is a futile effort and that they should hex Vee instead.

During the third season, it is revealed that, in her younger days, she became one of the many wives of a hippie cult leader, warmed by his compassion and kindness to her — it was, in fact, he who suggested that she did not talk if she didn't want to. Years later, after all of the other wives had long since abandoned him, he had become bitter, twisted and verbally abusive. Eventually, he had berated her for staying with him for so long. In a surge of anger, she pushed him off of a cliff to his death. Back at the prison, she ends up being the focus of a cult inside of the prison. She eventually throws Leanne out of the cult after being confronted by Poussey over Brook's suicide attempt.

At the end of the third-season finale, Norma is the first inmate to run out of the prison yard towards the lake when the fence is taken down, which inspires all of the other inmates to follow her lead.

In the fourth season, she is once again at Red's side and plays a very minimal role although is still respected by some of her cult friends such as Leanne and Gina. At the end of the fourth season, she is seen singing to and consoling the grieving Brook Soso, following the death of her girlfriend, Poussey.

During the fifth season, she does not actively participate in the riot, but she is invited to Freida's bunker. She eventually surrenders to the CERT team when they raid the prison at the end of the season. Following this, she is not seen during the sixth season. In the last episode of the seventh season she makes a cameo appearance.

Leanne Taylor
Leanne Taylor (played by Emma Myles) – An inmate who was often seen with Tiffany during the first season. She almost fanatically followed everything Tiffany says and was her groupie or right-hand woman. She is also addicted to drugs and has been seen exchanging sexual favors with Mendez.

In the second season, she stands up against Tiffany and is shown to break off into her own character with her friends, leaving Tiffany by herself. She also was one of the inmates that joined Brook during her hunger strike and attempted to politely suggest that she needed to start bathing before Tiffany interrupted her by bluntly telling Brook that she stank.

During the third season, it is revealed that she was Amish and that she became addicted to drugs during her Rumspringa. After choosing to be baptized, she was arrested after a bag with her ID in it was found with drugs. She was convinced to go undercover for the police in exchange for immunity and later leaves her community after overhearing her father wondering what to do with her. Back at the prison, she joins and eventually spearheads a cult based on Norma being able to perform miracles. She soon reveals herself to be cruel, bigoted and mean-spirited, when she starts bullying and discriminating against Brook, who in turn attempts to commit suicide. After learning of this, Norma dismisses Leanne in anger, leaving her in the same position she left Tiffany — isolated and friendless.

During the fourth season, she is at the meeting Piper was holding to counter Maria's influence and was the first to misinterpret Piper's intentions by saying a racist remark about the Dominicans. After Poussey's death, she was drunk from the last of her hooch with Angie and expressed all of the problems she believed were caused by Lolly's time machine before the two proceeded to destroy it.

After the inmates take over the prison at the beginning of the fifth season, she steals a CO uniform along with Angie and is running around pulling down the pants of other inmates. When Angie gets possession of the gun Humphrey smuggled in, the two decided to take advantage and force the guards to do a talent show. During the show, Stratman does a striptease with only a sock covering his penis. Later, when confronting Tiffany, she discovers that Tiffany was hiding Coates from the other inmates, and ends up losing part of a finger when the gun goes off. She decides to try and get a replacement finger and decides to settle with Stratman's finger. Stratman offers to let her test it out first, and proceeds to finger her and brings her to orgasm before he uses the opportunity to flee the prison. Angry at Tiffany for her finger, and unsatisfied with the inmate justice that was given to her, she joins Angie and bullies Tiffany until she ends up violating the terms of her inmate probation.

At the end of the season, when the CERT officers remove her from the prison, she sees her mother in the crowd surrounding the prison and shouts to her. She is transferred and does not appear in the sixth season.

Angie Rice
Angie Rice (played by Julie Lake) – Leanne's best-friend, and another former follower of Tiffany.

During the second season, she was one of the inmates that joined Brook's hunger strike in an attempt to improve prison conditions.

During the third season, she starts believing that Norma is able to perform miracles after a stash of heroin Nicky hid in a light fixture in the laundry room fell out. After finding the drugs, she shares them with Leanne and finds herself getting threatened by Luschek if she says anything about them. Later, she joins Norma's cult and is accidentally released months early due to a mistake caused by MCC's new computer system and the incompetence of the new staff. Believing a miracle has occurred, Angie leaves, but the error is quickly spotted and a low-key search is conducted. Caputo finds Angie at the bus station. He sits and talks with her, and she apologizes for escaping, admitting that she has nowhere to go. Sympathetic, Caputo drives her back to the prison in his car, promising her that a short stint in SHU will be her only punishment.

During the fourth season, she starts smuggling drugs into the prison by swallowing the drugs while being kissed during visiting hours and defecating the drugs in the shower. At the end of the season, while she is drunk on the last of Poussey's hooch, she decides to destroy Lolly's time machine after Leanne describes all of the harm that it has done.

During the fifth season, Angie steals a CO uniform and is running around pulling down the pants of other inmates. After they pull down Gloria's pants, the gun she took from Daya drops to the floor, and Angie takes possession of the gun. Following this, Angie and Leanne force the guards to perform a talent show. After finding Tiffany in the laundry room and eventually discovering that she was hiding Coates from the other inmates, she ends up watching Leanne get her finger shot off after Coates takes the gun. As a result, she ends up trying to help her get a replacement for her disfigured finger. Also, Angie and Leanne use the incident to get Tiffany tried by other inmates, only for them to continuously bully her until she breaks the "probation" the inmates gave her during her trial.

After the CERT members break up the riot, she is transferred to another prison and does not appear in the sixth season.

Maritza Ramos
Maritza Ramos (played by Diane Guerrero) – A Colombian-American inmate. In contrast to her rougher, more hardened cellmates, Maritza is quite demure and has a playful, sassy personality. She is often seen with Flaca, with whom she has a rivalry and close friendship; she is generally portrayed as somewhat more intelligent than her friend. On Valentine's Day, she and Flaca are having an intimate conversation in the kitchen, and when Flaca gives her a friendly peck on the lips, the two end up passionately kissing. They initially laugh in shock, before Flaca breaks down in tears, and Maritza consoles her, looking visibly shaken herself. She has a child on the outside.

In the third season, she is distraught when Flaca is accepted to another work detail but reunites with her friend when she joins Piper's used panty business. At the end of the season, she replaces Tiffany as the prison van driver after Tiffany faked a seizure to get away from Officer Coates.

In the fourth season, it is revealed that before her incarceration she was a small-time con artist who worked at an upscale nightclub, wherein she would fill empty bottles of expensive vodka with water, deliberately drop them and then panic about being fired in order to claim the price of the original drink from the people that she convinces had tripped her. One of her victims sees right through her and offers her in to his own, more elaborate confidence trick to steal expensive cars, which involved pretending to be a car saleswoman to entice middle-aged men to go on a test drive, while simultaneously pretending to be their trophy wife to get the keys, and stealing the car once the drive was over. On her first attempt, a salesman gets in the car with them, and when both men grow suspicious, she improvised by pretending to be travel-sick, before getting into the car without them and driving off.

Back in prison, when Maria starts a rival panty-smuggling business to Piper's, she uses Maritza to smuggle the panties out of the prison by hiding them in the wheel arches of the van and transferring them to Maria's cousin when she drops the COs off at their house. She also becomes friendly with McCullough, the CO who supervises her. When the COs spot the smuggler, she pretends he is a gardener and says "Follow me" in Spanish to him, not knowing that CO Humphrey can understand her. He reveals that he knows she's up to something, so she decides to draw the attention of the COs to her contact, threatening him into not returning. Humphrey overhears her talking with Flaca about whether she would rather eat ten dead houseflies or one live baby mouse, so, during a later shift change, he takes her in his house, holds her at gunpoint, and forces her to partake in a real-life version of that choice. Maritza eventually chooses the live baby mouse, and later shares the horror of the experience to Flaca. After Poussey's death, she and Flaca overhear the white supremacist inmates discussing retaliation against Poussey's friends, following this, the two decide to practice how to react to the press if they are interviewed.

During the uprising at the end of the season, she sees Humphrey attempting to unholster a gun, and she pushes him to the ground before he can use it. Following the start of the riot, Maritza and Flaca obtain smartphones, and begin to use them to film vlog posts detailing their makeup regime within the confines of the prison system, something that gradually earns them a following on YouTube which, by the time the riot comes to an end, has become big enough that many of their fans have crowded outside the prison to wave banners in support and in the hope of seeing them when the riot breaks up. As the CERT officers storm the prison, Maritza and Flaca film their last video, and refuse to co-operate with the officers. One of them fires a pepper bullet and blinds Maritza just long enough to restrain her.

Outside, as the inmates are being loaded onto their buses, Maritza is stopped from getting on the same bus Flaca was getting on. Distraught at being separated from her friend, she shouts to her that she loves her. While Maritza does not appear in the sixth season, Flaca mentions on her prison radio show with Cindy that she was sent to a prison 1500 miles away while responding to Cindy's anonymous letter.

Maritza reappears in the seventh season at a nightclub in New York while on parole. She wins a dancing contest at the club, which causes her to get noticed by some NBA players. After sleeping with one of them, he offers to fly her to Los Angeles for a weekend, but she declines due to her friend reminding her that her parole prohibits her from leaving the state. While out at another night club, she is arrested in an ICE raid due to her not having any identification on her proving she is a U.S. citizen and is detained at the PolyCon immigration detention facility with Blanca. Borrowing money from Blanca, she buys a phone card to call a lawyer but her card runs out of money before she can give them any useful information. She reunites with Flaca when Flaca is chosen for a cooking detail with the immigrant detainees and asks her to contact her mother for her U.S. birth certificate. Unknown to Maritza, her mother informs Flaca that she was actually born in Colombia, and is not a U.S. citizen after all. Gloria gives her a toll-free number she can use to contact a pro bono immigration lawyer and she gives the number to the other detainees despite threats that the facility can shut the phones down to stop them from calling, which is noticed by two ICE agents. Despite her attempts to get help from a lawyer, she is eventually given orders for deportation and is last seen being put on a chartered aircraft to be deported along with several other migrants.

Stella Carlin
Stella Carlin (played by Ruby Rose) — A young Australian inmate introduced in the third season, assigned to the prison's new garment factory with Piper. Strikingly beautiful, androgynous and intelligent, but also somewhat mysterious, she takes an immediate shine to Piper, and the two become fast friends. Stella is the first to volunteer for Piper's new used panty business and provides her with additional support in its management, all the while openly flirting with her. As Piper and Alex's relationship starts to suffer due to Alex's paranoia and Piper's darker personality, she and Stella become closer, and eventually kiss, although Stella continues to maintain a respectful distance at Piper's request, to spare Alex's feelings.

Later, when Piper and Alex decide to break up, she asks Stella to become her partner (both professionally and personally), despite the fact that Stella's release date is imminent. Shortly before Stella is scheduled to be released, however, she steals all of the money Piper has made from the business. Piper quickly deduces (based on the fact that only three people knew where the phone she used to transfer the money was kept) that it was Stella, and confronts her. Stella begs for forgiveness, justifying herself by the fact that her family is all back in Australia, she has no money left, and that she will have no place to go upon her release. Piper at first appears to forgive her and states that she can keep the money. Shortly afterward, Piper turns up at Stella's cubicle and gives her a kiss goodbye, which confuses Stella, as she still has a couple of days left. At that moment, the COs arrive and search her bunk, discovering some contraband items that Piper had planted. As Stella is removed with the possibility of facing an extended sentence in maximum security, Piper gives her a final, cold smile, showing her the "Trust No Bitch" tattoo that Stella herself had given her.

In the fourth season, she is briefly seen in max with Nicky. In their brief interaction, it is shown that they are engaging in physical intimacy, although Nicky promptly dumps Stella when she takes delivery of heroin from a guard, with Nicky stating that she wants nothing to do with her if she is using drugs. Stella does not appear for the remainder of the series, as she had left Litchfield sometime after her encounter with Nicky. However, during the sixth season, inmate Madison Murphy reveals while demanding that Piper fill up her commissary as payment for arranging for Alex to be moved next door to her cell that Stella, out of anger, had provided her with a lot of dirt on Piper, including the fact that she came from money.

Anita DeMarco
Anita DeMarco (played by Lin Tucci) – An older inmate who was one of the first to befriend Piper. Piper learns that when DeMarco first arrived in prison many years earlier, she had a heart attack, and now sleeps with a face mask and CPAP machine. DeMarco was a constant roommate of Miss Rosa, and seems to have a steady stream of newbies who stay in her room until the newbies are assigned permanent bunks.

Maureen Kukudio
Maureen Kukudio (played by Emily Althaus) – A younger inmate introduced in the third season, Maureen becomes an obsessive fan of Suzanne's new erotica series, which she began writing in the drama class they both attended. She perpetually irritates Suzanne by offering her ideas for her upcoming chapters and writing her own fan-fiction. As time progresses, however, it becomes clear that Maureen is romantically interested in Suzanne, who becomes nervous, as she has never actually had a girlfriend or any sexual experience — she writes her erotica almost entirely from imagination. She backs out of a sexual liaison with Maureen in one of the storage closets, due to her apprehension and lack of sexual experience, but the two continue to flirt, and they are brought closer in the final scene when Suzanne retrieves a terrapin that Maureen threw away after it bit her foot.

At the beginning of the fourth season, she attempts to get closer to Suzanne, but Suzanne turns her away after she discovers her to be quite a strange person. She decides to stay in the woods and is discovered hiding in one of the houses by Caputo later that night. Although her offense is unknown, when Caputo read her file he is visibly shocked and horrified and other inmates also imply she did something bad. Later on during the season, she appears to reconcile with Suzanne and meets her in the cleaning closet. As revenge for leaving her in the woods, Maureen sexually stimulates Suzanne in the closet, but intentionally leaves her unsatisfied. During the lockdown after Aydin's remains were found, she volunteers to fight Suzanne and after repeatedly taunting Suzanne, she is brutally beaten and is sent to medical, with the right side of her face badly bruised and her right eye swollen shut. Nevertheless, she is visibly glad to see that Suzanne is moved into the bed next to her.

During the fifth season, when CO Humphrey is brought into the facility and put between the two, Maureen attempts to impress Suzanne by blowing oxygen bubbles into Humphrey's IV tube. This causes him to have an air embolism, which resulted in a stroke which ultimately kills him. Later on, Suzanne takes Maureen out of bed and helps her to the cafeteria to join the other rioters, and the two organize a seance at the site of Poussey's death. At the end of the fifth season, when Suzanne is starting to have a meltdown owing to not taking her medication, she finds Maureen almost unconscious in the bathroom. Her condition has deteriorated due to an infection and the lack of medical attention and she is taken back to her bed in medical. When CERT storms the prison, she physically lashes out at the officers who have come to empty the medical center and is roughly pulled from her bed in retaliation. A few days later, after Alex returns from the hospital from being treated for her broken arm, she reveals to Piper that Maureen ultimately died of her infection.

Mei Chang
Mei Chang (played by Lori Tan Chinn; portrayed by Teresa Ting in flashbacks) – An irritable, laconic Chinese woman who runs the prison commissary.

In the first and second seasons, she is shown to be somewhat ill-tempered and antisocial, though widely accepted.

In the third season, her secretive everyday routine and murky past are revealed. Chang emigrated to the U.S. from Hubei province in the early eighties with the intention of marrying a businessman. However, he rejects her upon seeing her, mostly because of her skin disorder. To pay off her debts, Chang worked in a Chinese herbal medicinal shop for her brother. Stating that he has no better use for her and that she is practically invisible, Chang's brother sends her out to accompany the gang members who purchase and distribute illegal medicines to shops like theirs. During a transaction with a Korean smuggler, Chang revealed herself to be sharper and more ruthless than she let on when she discovered that the products were fake, prompting the smuggler to attack the gangster who had accompanied her. She saves the gangster's life by knocking out the smuggler with a tire iron, and he promises to repay her. She has the gangster and his associates bring her the businessman who spurned her. During the confrontation, the businessman curses and spits at her, prompting her to order the gangsters to cut out his gallbladder as she leaves. In prison, she maintains a set of rituals which confuse the other inmates and makes her own food using what she can smuggle out of the canteen and obtain from the commissary. She spends her afternoons watching Chinese TV shows on a smartphone she keeps hidden in one of the prison sheds and keeps a bag of tangerines hidden in the long grass near the prison fence. Despite her solitary behavior, she appears to enjoy observing the other inmates around her.

At the beginning of the fourth season, she declines to go to the lake with most of the other prisoners, and instead uses the incident as an opportunity to take a private shower.

In the fifth season, as the riot is going on, she escapes through the hole in the fence made by another inmate in a failed escape attempt. However, in the sixth season, it is revealed that she was eventually caught, and transferred to another prison. She makes one more appearance at the end of the seventh season at the immigration detention facility Blanca and Maritza were detained in.

Jimmy Cavanaugh
Jimmy Cavanaugh (played by Patricia Squire) – One of the "Golden Girls", Jimmy is an elderly woman with severe dementia or Alzheimer's. She wanders out of the prison and is seen at a bar by Caputo, whereupon she is returned to the prison. Later, she jumps off the raised stage in the chapel, thinking she is jumping into a swimming pool and breaks her arm. The prison system decides that her care is too expensive and grants her a "compassionate release," which amounts to them dropping her off at a bus stop to be left to her own devices, completely senile and incapable of caring for herself.

Lolly Whitehill
Lolly Whitehill (played by Lori Petty; portrayed by Christina Brucato in flashbacks) – Lolly is first seen on the plane that is taking Piper to Chicago at the beginning of the second season. While in Chicago, she is attacked in the prison yard after getting in a confrontation with another prisoner.

During the third season, she is transferred to Litchfield and starts a trend of inmates requesting kosher meals. She seemed to have an obsession with Alex and is seen keeping notes of her daily routine. During a work detail, she breaks a window and keeps a piece of glass from the window. She is confronted by Alex in the bathroom and attempts to use the glass shard to defend herself before being overpowered and nearly strangled by Alex in a panic. During their struggle, Lolly claims that she is being framed for treason by the NSA and that the prison is bugged, and is revealed to be paranoid and delusional.

At the beginning of the fourth season, she finds Aydin attempting to choke Alex to death in the prison greenhouse, and pushes him off of her and knocks him unconscious. The following day, she helps Alex and Frieda chop up his body and buries it in the garden. She becomes extremely paranoid and believes that Aydin was a government agent, later believing that a drone she sees flying over the prison is the government targeting her in retaliation for killing him (in reality, the drone was the paparazzi taking pictures of Judy behind bars). Flashbacks to her time before prison show her as a young reporter. While young Lolly was gifted and enthusiastic, she frequently pestered her boss with allegations that various local businesses were involved in high-level schemes, which clashed with her low-level community news assignments. Her paranoia began early in her professional life, which caused her to distrust and unnerve her boss. It is also shown that she began hearing voices in her head. Eventually, she was fired from her job and offloaded from her family, who attempted to move her into a halfway house. Terrified and paranoid about her new surroundings, Lolly runs away, eventually becoming homeless, where she functions as a generally good-natured, but highly paranoid person. She is arrested after threatening two police officers that asked her to leave the area.

She is taken under Healy's wing and confesses that she killed Aydin to him, but her confession is dismissed as a delusion. Healy was able to convince her that Aydin's death was a delusion, before putting her on a treatment plan. She tries to build a time machine, which other inmates used as a makeout area. After Aydin's remains are found, Healy gets her sent to psych. She reappears in the sixth season after the inmates from the riot are transferred to max, while Suzanne is getting an evaluation. Later on, she speaks to Maria after she is sent to psych when the guards are accusing her of attempting suicide after she was pushed into the toilet. During the seventh season, Lolly is transferred to Florida after PolyCon closed Psych down. She spent a lot of time with Suzanne at their chicken farm until it was shut down due to drugs.

Judy King
Judy King (played by Blair Brown) — A TV personality with a culinary show, her character is loosely based on Martha Stewart and Paula Deen. Judy was shown throughout the third season on trial for tax evasion and was eventually convicted of the charges. Originally opting to go to an alternative prison, she decides to spend her time in prison at Litchfield.

At the end of the third season, she reports for her sentence, but she becomes upset after she finds the reception room empty due to most of the guards going on strike prior to her arrival.

At the beginning of the fourth season, she surrenders to Luschek in the prison mail room and later starts a friendship with him. Due to her celebrity status, Caputo starts giving her special treatment under orders from MCC, to include giving her a private room and looking the other way when she possessed contraband. Charming, charismatic and generally quite friendly, Judy quickly manages to make friends amongst the other inmates despite the special treatment she receives. Against her wishes, Healy decides to make her teach a cooking class, and she used Poussey as an assistant. Impressed with her, she gave Poussey her contact information so she can seek a job in her company after she got out. While in prison, a racist puppet show she did in the 80s was leaked onto the internet, and as a result, she believes that the black inmates are planning to jump her in retaliation. She later finds out that they were just trying to get a picture of her to sell to the paparazzi. Deciding to go along with it, she takes a picture of herself kissing Black Cindy, and then pretends to be in a relationship with her. After learning about Luschek's guilt for getting Nicky sent to max, she uses her money and influence to get Nicky returned to minimum security and demands that Luschek have sex with her for her trouble. When the prison is put on lockdown after Aydin's remains are found, she gets Yoga Jones, Luschek, and herself high on Ecstasy and has a threesome with them.

At the end of the fourth season, MCC decides to release her early due to Poussey's death, and backdate her release on the paperwork so it would appear she was already gone when Poussey died. Before she could get out of the prison, she was caught in the uprising that started after Taystee informed the other prisoners that Bayley wasn't being arrested for Poussey's death.

During the fifth season, when her attempt to get out of the prison fails, she attempts to hide from the other inmates only to end up being captured by the white supremacist inmates. Taystee and her crew end up negotiating to get possession of Judy, so they can use her to release a statement to the press, and prior to giving the statement Black Cindy used her for slave labor. Before Judy can give the prepared statement, she is interrupted by Taystee, who ends up completing the statement and releasing her. Following her release, Judy appears on a primetime news show with Aleida and reveals her experiences behind bars, before revealing that Daya shot Humphrey at the beginning of the riot, although not mentioning either one by name. After Judy described the shooter to Aleida, she immediately knew that Judy was talking about her daughter.

Judy reappears near the end of the seventh season after her new book is mentioned and distributed among the inmates at Litchfield. At her office, she received a call from Taystee, who tells her about her idea to start a loan system for inmates to get them on their feet after they get released. With her help, Taystee is able to get the Poussey Washington Fund started.
 Kohan had personally asked Brown if she could be on OITNB. One consideration was that Brown, raised by her Southern mother, was able to use a Southern accent.

Alison Abdullah
Alison Abdullah (played by Amanda Stephen) — An African-American inmate and observant Muslim who becomes one of Black Cindy's new roommates. The two quickly clash over their shared space in the bunk, which escalates into a turf war, all the while trading barbs over their respective religions, which leads Cindy to give her the nickname "Jihad". They eventually overcame their differences, due to their mutual hatred of Scientology, and formed a truce in an attempt to take a picture of Judy to sell to the paparazzi with her smuggled cell phone she hides in her hijab. She was previously shown texting her child, Farah, on the phone.

At the end of the fourth season, while the black inmates are grieving Poussey's death, she lowers her hijab and reveals her hair (shown to be bright red), which brings some comic relief for her friends.

During the fifth season, she joins her friends during the riot, and when Taystee is made the spokeswoman for the demands to end the riot, she helps take the tally to prepare it for the negotiators. Flashbacks reveal that she was married, and her husband Hassan eventually found another woman to take as his second wife. Over time, she would become upset when her husband's second wife Sahar would spend more time with Hassan and she would have less say in how Farah was raised. As the riot continued, she eventually takes off her prison uniform and puts on a CO's uniform. Along with Cindy, she stops Suzanne from pushing Humphrey in a wheelchair to Taystee, which would have endangered negotiations.

At the end of the fifth season, after the CERT officers breach the prison, she removes her hijab before leaving the prison. She is concerned about her friends as the buses pull up to take the inmates away. She appears briefly in the series finale at a prison in Ohio, coaching Janae's running practice.

Kasey Sankey
Kasey Sankey (played by Kelly Karbacz) — An inmate with white supremacist leanings (although she insists on being called a "white nationalist," and resents being called a neo-Nazi, insisting that there is a difference between the two) who arrives at the prison at the beginning of the fourth season, along with two skinhead friends of hers; Brandy Epps and Helen "Skinhead Helen" Van Maele. Kasey immediately antagonizes the non-white inmates, first causing trouble when she leads her friends in an attack on Blanca following an argument over the TV. Following this, Kasey is jumped by a group of Blanca's friends, consisting of Maria, Ramona, and Ouija. Later, when Piper was attempting to start a watch group to counteract Maria's takeover of the prison, she misinterpreted Piper's intentions as a desire to start a white supremacist group and started a "white lives matter" chant with the other inmates in the room. During a gang activity meeting led by Officer Dixon, she told him about the used panty business, which eventually resulted in both Piper and Maria's businesses being shut down. After Aydin's remains are found, she is taken to the visitor area to await further interrogation. The guard monitoring the group, Officer Humphrey, plays a cruel prank on her by pulling her chair out from under her. She is laughed at by most of the inmates in the room, but when Humphrey tries to instigate a fight between her and Suzanne, she declines and watches in obvious dismay as Suzanne becomes unhinged and violently beats Maureen to within an inch of her life. Disgusted by the incident, Kasey and some of the other white supremacists approach Suzanne's friends in the African-American group, and later Maria's gang, to enlist them in going after Humphrey, admitting that her hatred of him far outweighs her racist beliefs. She is hit in the face by Janae after she makes an insensitive remark while Poussey's body is being removed from the prison, which almost resulted in a fight between her gang and Poussey's friends.

At the end of the fourth season, she is at the front of the crowd of white inmates in the riot and loudly tries to encourage Daya to shoot Humphrey. In the fifth season, Kasey's gang is taken captive and locked in the pantry with Frieda by CO's Stratman and Blake, but eventually, they break out with Frieda's ingenuity. They then take Judy King hostage with Yoga Jones and Anita DeMarco, and attempt to ransom her for a supply drop from what turns out to be a media helicopter; Kasey does not join her friends owing to her shocking discovery that her friend she gave permission to sleep with her husband while she was locked up is forming a loving relationship with him and their daughter. She became especially upset after seeing a social media post with her daughter being given a cake based on The Little Mermaid, a story she dislikes, and states that she lives in a small town resulting in everybody knowing about what is going on.

As the season progresses, Kasey's gang form an unlikely bond with Ouija and Pidge, Maria Ruiz's two henchwomen, which grows when they set up a coffee parlor together. While at the parlor, she reveals her musical talents when she is playing the ukulele while singing Good Riddance (Time of Your Life) in front of the other prisoners. Later on, she goes to the pharmacy to get some pain relievers from Lorna, but after initially being offered Advil Lorna rescinded the offer after Kasey made a racist remark about the Latino inmates. When the CERT officers storm the prison at the end of the riot, Kasey's gang ultimately invites Ouija and Pidge to join them in fighting them off. The five then barricade themselves inside a dorm room and, between them, manage to take down several officers before being restrained. Following this, she is removed from Litchfield and doesn't appear in the sixth season.

Kasey appears briefly in the series finale at the Ohio facility, in which is revealed that she is trying to move away from her white supremacist views, and is reading Rising out of Hatred by Eli Saslow. She has also developed feelings for Brook, and is shown interrupting her private stroll in order to flirt with her by reading a Haiku she wrote.

Brandy Epps
Brandy Epps  (played by Asia Kate Dillon) – A white supremacist that is part of Kasey's gang. Unlike Kasey, who resents the term, she is proud of the title "neo-Nazi" and sports a German tattoo as well as a Confederate flag tattoo on the back of her neck. During the riot, her gang captured Judy when she was trying to escape at night, and shortly after Taystee tried to get Judy to use her to read off their demands Brandy sold Judy to Black Cindy for some rainbow unicorn stickers, a 2007 Anne Geddes babies calendar, and several other art items to the ire of Kasey. Despite their white supremacist views, she and Helen become good friends with Ouija and Pidge, who are both of Dominican heritage. Brandy at one point relates to them that she was featured in a Barista-themed magazine for her coffee-making brilliance, before noting that she ended up in the prison because she combined her professional and racial beliefs and got arrested for poisoning several customers who were Jewish or black at her coffee house. After Helen finished her poem at the coffee shop, she encouraged Ouija to get in front of the other inmates and do impressions of Lorna, Nicky, and Red.  At the end of the season, her gang, as well as her new friends, barricade themselves to battle the CERT officers that are breaking up the riot and were captured with the rest of the inmates. Following this, she is not seen in the sixth season.

Helen Van Maele
Helen "Skinhead Helen" Van Maele  (played by Francesca Curran) – Another white supremacist who is part of Kasey's gang. Like Brandy, she embraces being a neo-Nazi and sports several Nazi tattoos and a shaved head. She first appears in the fourth season and joins the white supremacist group Piper accidentally formed when she was trying to shut down Maria's competing used panty business. After the riot starts, she, along with Kasey, Brandy, and Freida are captured by Blake and Stratman. The guards release them after Freida tricks them into thinking that she poisoned them. She helps capture Judy when she was trying to flee the prison and keep her prisoner until Brandy auctions her off. During the auction, she showed her love for unicorns when she got excited after Black Cindy offered unicorn stickers in exchange for Judy. Despite her white supremacist views, she along with Brandy become good friends with Ouija and Pidge, who are both of Dominican heritage, and they start a coffee shop with the Dominicans during the riot. At the coffee shop, she again shows her love for fantasy characters when she orders a drink at the makeshift coffee shop with the nickname Princess Buttercream, and she recites a poem containing many of the demands the prisoners had to end the riot. At the end of the fifth season, she is one of the people that barricade themselves while CERT is clearing the prison and fights back when they try to capture her. Following this, at the beginning of the sixth season, she is briefly seen in the Ohio facility some of the other prisoners were sent to. While the other inmates were getting their hair cut, she is excused from the barber due to already being bald.

Jennifer Digori

Jennifer Digori (played by Olivia Luccardi) – Another inmate in Kasey's gang. She first appears in the second season on the plane taking Piper to Chicago to testify in Kubra Balik's trial and is sitting next to Lolly. She is transferred to Lichfield in the fourth season and quickly joins Kasey and the other racist inmates. She joins them in attacking Blanca and complains about the treatment of white inmates during Piper's attempt to shut down Maria's competing used panty business. She is present when Kasey insults Poussey as her body is being loaded in an ambulance, and she is with the other white inmates when the riot starts. She takes advantage of the situation and steals a headset and cell phone, but later she trades the cell phone for a bag of candy. At the end of the fifth season, she hides under a table when CERT is clearing the prison, but she was quickly captured and taken outside. Following this, she is loaded on the buses and is not seen in the following season.

Stephanie Hapakuka
Stephanie Hapakuka (played by Jolene Purdy) — A Hawaiian inmate who becomes Piper's new bunkmate in the fourth season. Due to her somewhat imposing demeanor, Piper hires her as "muscle", although she is actually quite peaceable and non-violent. She takes an immediate dislike to Piper, considering her to be inauthentic and self-centered, and later lures her into a trap set up by the Dominicans.
 Purdy, who in real life is often questioned about her ethnicity, stated that portraying Hapakuka "has been so great for me" as the character is "the closest to my own ethnicity that I've ever played" and that Hapakuka herself is, like Purdy, questioned about her ethnicity.

Alana Dwight
Alana Dwight (played by Shannon Esper) is an inmate who is introduced in season 4 along with Hapakuka as Piper & Red's new bunkmates. Throughout season 4,5 & 6, she becomes involved in a running gag in which she has her nose broken. In season 6 she befriends Irene "Zirconia" Cabrera.

Irene "Zirconia" Cabrera
Irene "Zirconia" Cabrera (played by Daniella De Jesus) – An inmate who is introduced in the fourth season. She is often seen with her friends Ouija and Pidge. During the riots in the fifth season, she is seen taking Linda's heels & jacket, and after discovering that Linda works for MCC, she chases after her with the sharpened heels. When the riot comes to an end, she breaks her leg and is carried out of the prison by Luschek. In the sixth season, she attends Luschek's exercise classes, where she becomes jealous of Gloria and Luschek dancing together. As a result, she lies to Madison and gets her to threaten Gloria into not returning to the classes. Due to Ouija and Pidge being moved to other prisons, Zirconia befriends Alana Dwight. At the end of the sixth season, she is recruited by C-block to participate in Barb and Carol's war. Later she is seen playing kickball with the rest of C and D block. She makes one more appearance in the series finale, where she is attending the financial class for the inmates preparing to be released and who will be among the first to benefit from the Poussey Washington Fund.

Ramona "Pidge" Contreras
Ramona "Pidge" Contreras (played by Miriam Morales) - A Hispanic inmate who is amongst the new clutch of inmates that arrive at the prison at the start of the fourth season. She is usually seen with her friend, Ouija.

Early on in the season, she, Ouija and Blanca get into a dispute with inmate Kasey Sankey over watching a scoreless FIFA world cup qualifier rather than a travel documentary. This results in Blanca being attacked. Under Maria Ruiz's leadership, Ramona and some other inmates violently beat Kasey in Sophia's old salon. They then form a gang consisting of the new contingent of Dominican Americans that has arrived at the prison. Later, Maria tries to persuade Piper to take on both Ramona and Ouija as employees for her used panty business, which only leads to an explosive fight between them. Ramona, who had previously been told that Piper was the "boss" of the prison, warns her that Maria's comments that she was getting too big for her boots were a threat. Later, the group makes good on their threat when they take Piper by surprise, drag her into the kitchen and brand her with a swastika.

In the fifth season, while rounding up the guards and other hostages with Ouija during the prison riot, Ramona steals Linda's high-heels and spends most of the season guarding the hostages. She also joins Ouija and the white supremacists in setting up a coffee shop in the rec room, which proves a hit with the inmates - until the coffee runs out.

Towards the end of the season, she and Ouija start to suffer from the lack of sleep and sustenance and take to snorting coffee granules like cocaine, which initially has the desired effect, but eventually causes her severe vomiting spells. When the CERT officers breach the front doors of the prison, Ramona and Ouija initially plan to fend them off in the library but instead end up joining the white supremacists in barricading themselves in one of the dorms, which is booby trapped. The five of them manage to injure a large number of CERT officers before they are restrained and marched outside to join the other prisoners. Following their capture, she is loaded on the buses outside and does not appear in the sixth season.

Carmen "Ouija" Aziza
Carmen "Ouija" Aziza (played by Rosal Colon) - A Hispanic inmate who enters the prison at the start of the fourth season. She is usually accompanied by Ramona, who arrived at the prison with her, and the two appear to be close friends. She has three teardrop tattoos under her left eye, which she claims is to indicate that she has killed three people (contemptuously remarking that she is in prison for WIC fraud). Upon her arrival in the prison, Ouija immediately chats up Flaca, upon noticing the teardrop under her own eye, which she is disappointed to learn is just makeup, and questions her about the balance of power amongst the inmates. Later, following an argument with Kasey Sankey, Ouija joins Maria Ruiz's new gang and later offers her services to Piper's business at Maria's suggestion, which is rebuffed. Upon the discovery of Aydin's body, she is among those separated from the other inmates for further questioning. Upon witnessing Suzanne beat Maureen Kukudio almost to death, Ouija helps Maria drag Suzanne off.

In the fifth season, she joins Ramona in guard duty over the hostages, and later helps set up a coffee parlor with the white supremacists, where Ouija reveals herself to be a very talented impressionist, impressing the other inmates with her dead-on impressions of the inmates and guards. When the long period of time with no sleep and sustenance starts to take its toll on her, Ouija joins Ramona in snorting coffee, which ultimately causes her diarrhea. At the end of the season, she joins Ramona and the white supremacists in fighting off the CERT officers. Ouija briefly appears at an Ohio facility in the sixth season with Big Boo, laughing knowingly as Linda Ferguson's hair is cut off, moments before a guard comes to tell Linda she is free.

Barbara Denning
Barbara "Barb" Denning (played by Mackenzie Phillips; portrayed by Lauren Kelston in flashbacks) – The older sister of Carol and Debbie Denning. In flashbacks during the 80s, she was in high school and worked as a waitress in the same restaurant as Carol. She was angry over having to move, leaving behind her friends and boyfriend because of Debbie's gymnastic competitions. After her parents order both her and Carol to watch Debbie for the evening, she attempts to tell her father that she can move in with friends until she graduates, but this angers him. Later that night, she and Carol drive Debbie to a frozen lake to release her tadpoles, and after she released the tadpoles she tells Debbie to get in the car after Carol runs at them screaming with a hatchet in her hand. After Debbie got in the car, Barb shows Debbie that she has the locks so she can't get out. Following this, the two older sisters push the car into the lake and she hummed the song Maniac (the song playing during Debbie's final gymnastics performance) after watching the car sink into the lake. After arriving at Litchfield, the sisters are in different cellblocks and have rules in place on selling contraband. Following an altercation involving both sisters and a young Frieda, both cell blocks are playing kickball when Carol starts a cell block war and slashes Barb in the face before they realize that both of them were betrayed by Frieda in exchange for her being moved to minimum security. Both sisters have time added to their sentences due to Freida's actions.

In the present, she is the leader of D-Block and has Daddy reporting directly to her while bringing drugs into the prison. She is also a drug addict herself at this point. She becomes angry when supply lines for the drugs they were smuggling in are cut due to Daddy and the other inmates releasing the rats in the kitchen. After a bad experience with bath salts, she is convinced by Nicky to become clean. She decides to try and kill Carol, but the plan is ruined when Nicky tries to warn Red, which results in CO Copeland being alerted to the attempt on her life. Shortly after this, Copeland puts her and Carol in a cell together, with the hope that they attack each other, but the two stare at each other the entire night without engaging. After being returned to D-Block, she starts a plan to start a war during the kickball game between the blocks, but it was just a distraction so she and Carol can switch into B-Block uniforms and sneak into "Florida" during the chaos to kill Freida. Their plan fails when the women outside become too caught up in the game to start fighting, and the sisters attack each other, with her throat being slashed and Barb putting a shank in Carol's back.

Carol Denning
Carol Denning (played by Henny Russell; portrayed by Ashley Jordyn in flashbacks) – The younger sister of Barbara Denning and the older sister of Debbie Denning. In flashbacks during the 80s, she was in high school and worked as a waitress with her older sister. During one of Debbie's performances she showed Barb her notebook with drawings of ways to murder their younger sister and when they decide to go through with it Barb tells her to burn the book. Later that night, after she threatens to kill Debbie's tadpoles before being stopped by Barb she and Barb drive Debbie to a frozen lake to release them. While Barb and Debbie are outside she runs up to them with a hatchet and Barb tells Debbie to get back in the car. Following this after Debbie realized that she's trapped, they push the car into the lake. After arriving at Litchfield, she and Barb are in different cellblocks and have an agreement in place on distributing contraband. Carol became friendly with Freida and worked with her as a partner in her enterprise. Following an altercation involving both sisters and Freida, both cell blocks are playing kickball when she deflates the kickball and starts a cell block war.  She slashes Barb in the face and accuses her of stealing her contraband, but Barb denies it and they realize that both were betrayed by Freida in exchange for her being moved to minimum security. Both sisters have time added to their sentences due to Freida's actions. Carol particularly feels hatred for Freida, due to the personal betrayal of their friendship.

In the present, she is the leader of C-Block and has Madison Murphy as her second in command. Like her sister, she tends not to play an active role in her gang, preferring to play bridge with her inner circle. She has developed something of an addiction to candy as a result of having given up smoking (an idea suggested by Russell, who is herself a smoker). While Freida is being moved to “Florida,” she sees her and realized that she's back in max. She becomes friends with Red due to their mutual hatred of Freida. Later, she is approached by Alex, asking her to stop Madison from trying to plant drugs on Piper to get her sentence extended. After a failed attempt by Barb to kill her in the prison salon, she and Barb are locked in the same cell while CO Copeland watches in hopes that they would fight. After they failed to do so, they are taken back to their respective blocks and Carol reveals her plan to attack Barb and the rest of D-Block during the kickball game. The plan was a distraction so that the sisters could change into B-Block uniforms and sneak into "Florida" during the chaos, giving them a chance to kill Freida. When the inmates playing kickball get too caught up in the game to fight, the sisters turn against each other and she slits Barb's throat while Barb stabbed her in the back.
 Russell, in an interview, described older Carol as "stuck in the ‘80s", being the era of her teenage years and the period when Carol was first imprisoned.

Dominga "Daddy" Duarte
Dominga "Daddy" Duarte (played by Vicci Martinez) – An inmate in D-Block, who is introduced in the sixth season. Her nickname comes from both her androgynous appearance and her former occupation as the manager of a high-end prostitution service. Flashbacks reveal that she had a close relationship with several of the girls that worked for her, and that at least one was killed by a client. In the present, she is Barb's right-hand woman and manages the day-to-day operations of the D-Block gang due to Barb's drug addiction. She takes an immediate shine to Daya when she first arrives at max after pleading guilty to killing CO Humphrey and receiving a life sentence and makes numerous attempts to befriend her. This includes giving her oxycodone to help her manage the pain from the constant beatings and assaults that she receives from the guards, which results in Daya developing an opioid addiction. However, Daddy later suffers a setback when she floods the prison's cheese packaging facility with rats to land D-Block preferable job assignments, unaware that the supply line for Barb's drug smuggling operation relies on it. The manufacturer consequently pulls its contract with the prison, cutting off the supply line, and all of the addicts on D-Block, including Daya, start to go into withdrawal. Barb orders her to create a new supply line, but she soon runs out of ideas and ends up making the situation even worse when Daya figures out where Barb's personal stash of oxy is kept and takes it away. Despite her anger, Daddy ends up reciprocating when Daya kisses her to placate her. Daya eventually helps her by convincing her mother, Aleida to hide heroin baggies in the false bottoms of the chocolate protein shake bottles that her new boyfriend, Captain of the Guards Rick Hopper brings into work each day. Eventually, Daya confesses to Daddy that she has feelings for her, and the two begin a relationship. When Carol and Barb plan a major fight during the prison kickball tournament that Piper organized, Daddy joins the team on the field with the intent to signal when it is time to attack. However, like every other person on the field except for Madison Murphy, Daddy gets caught up in the game, and ultimately doesn't give the signal.

At the beginning of the seventh season, Daya suspects Daddy is cheating on her, and later catches her in the act of doing so. When Daddy attempts to brush it off as simply business, Daya seemingly accepts this, and offers her some drugs as a peace offering. However, it turns out that Daya had given her bath salts in an effort to punish her and assumed she would simply have an episode similar to Barb when she took them. Instead, Daddy ends up dying of an overdose, and although initially shaken, Daya ultimately usurps Daddy's position.

Madison Murphy
Madison "Badison" Murphy (played by Amanda Fuller) – An inmate in C-Block, and who reports directly to Carol Denning as part of her crew, although Carol is openly contemptuous of her, particularly in regards to her nickname. At the beginning of the sixth season, Madison is put in the same cell as Red after leaving medical with a cast on her arm and causes Piper to trip and get her sent to medical when she was trying to find Alex. She becomes Piper's roommate and the two do not get along. Flashbacks from her teenage years showed that she had severe anger issues, and she was constantly the target of ridicule to include her being nicknamed "Fartison" for an incident she had in the fourth grade. She got kicked out of school for throwing a beaker at a classmate, and she was also violent with her parents resulting in them sending her to a behavioral camp. After several confrontations with other girls at the camp, she betrays Roach, the one friend she had by spraying her with an aerosol can only to cause her to run into the campfire and set herself on fire. Presumably because of her prior victimization, Madison has become a bully herself. Back in the prison, after Alex arrives from the hospital, she tells one of the other inmates to move rooms so Alex can be near Piper and then punishes the inmate later that night for not immediately agreeing the first time she was asked. When Piper successfully gets kickball reinstated, Madison is upset that Piper is picked as a team captain instead of her, and she becomes very vindictive to the point where she plants drugs on her in an attempt to get her sentence extended. She is ordered by Carol to leave Piper alone, but not before asking CO Hellman to write a negative report on Piper in exchange for simultaneous oral sex from inmates Charlene Teng and Shruti Chambal. She helps Carol plan the gang war for the kickball game, but when Carol isn't at the game she attempts to start the war anyway by giving the signal. The inmates decide to keep playing instead, ignoring her signal, and Alex tells her to give up on the war. In the seventh season, Madison openly taunts Alex with her intention to have her sentence extended, and schemes with Hellman to have Alex transferred out of state. However, on two occasions, she ends up triggering Taystee into a fight, and gets severely beaten up. Eventually, Tamika decides that Madison is too much of a troublemaker, and has her transferred to Missouri instead of Alex; Madison is last seen being dragged, kicking and screaming, into a transfer bus.
 The creators intended for her to have a Boston accent; the British newspaper Daily Express stated that some viewers expressed dissatisfaction with the accent on social media.

Adeola Chinede
Adeola Chinede (played by Sipiwe Moyo) – An inmate introduced in the sixth season. Originally from Ibadan in Nigeria (although she tells the inmates that she is from Lagos, which is more well known), she is housed in Block D of max and quickly becomes Lorna's cellmate and friend. She is exceptionally intelligent and well educated, having originally worked as an evolutionary anthropologist back home, and has a very dry sense of humor. She is also known for her somewhat alarming character quirks, such as raising a family of rats in her cell, and her tendency to make disturbing remarks about her past crimes. In the seventh season, she deduces that Daya killed Daddy by giving her a drug overdose and encourages her to establish herself as the new drug boss in the prison. After helping Daya by acting as muscle, Adeola becomes her right-hand woman.

Rhea Boyle 
Rhea Boyle (played by Yelena Shmulenson) – A Jewish inmate who is used by Black Cindy to convert to Judaism. Boyle is shown to be rather monotonous and blunt and only shows small personality when talking about her child, a 5-year-old. Boyle then also educates Leanne Taylor and Angie Rice on dinosaurs while waiting in line at the pharmacy.

Tricia Miller
Patricia "Tricia" Miller (played by Madeline Brewer) – An inmate who grew up on the streets and one of the youngest inmates. She is a drug addict and lesbian who sports a tattoo on her throat and cornrows. While outside prison, Tricia showed kleptomaniac tendencies, often taking things that she promised herself she would later pay for, reasoning she would not be a thief if she did so. She kept a list of all the things she ever stole with the intention of settling all her debts when she had the money. She is caught by Miss Claudette attempting to plant drugs in her girlfriend Mercy's bunk so she would get more time, but ultimately backs down and lets her girlfriend get released. She asks Piper to help her in writing her letter of appeal so that she can get out faster and be with Mercy, although she has not been able to contact her. Tricia gets drugs from the prison guard Mendez in exchange for sexual favors. When he is late with his deliveries, she goes into drug withdrawal and is taken to the SHU. Due to Red's intolerance for drugs and it being her "second offense", Tricia is ejected from Red's "family". Red later admits that she had only intended Tricia's ejection to be temporary, and to force her to learn her lesson. Mendez tries to blackmail her into selling drugs for him again, though she tells him she wants to be clean again. Later, Mendez notices that she is in a drugged out state, and realizing that she has helped herself to some of his stash, and that this might reveal the presence of drugs in the prison, he quickly hides her in an empty broom cupboard. After discovering she was specifically requested for a Scared Straight visit with delinquent kids, he returns to get her and discovers that she is dead, revealing that she had in fact taken the entire bag — most likely in a final act of sacrifice to protect Red and her family. In a panic, he manipulates the situation to make it look like a suicide by hanging. A grieving Red blames herself for driving Tricia away. The truth of her death is never discovered by the administration, although Nicky quickly deduces what happened and tells Red.

Mercy Valduto
Mercy Valduto (played by Katie Iacona) – Tricia Miller's girlfriend and Big Boo's ex-girlfriend. During the week of her release, she antagonized Big Boo, but they still departed on good terms. Tricia was prepared to plant drugs on Mercy to extend her sentence so they could stay together, but Miss Claudette talked Tricia out of it, determined not to let her screw up Mercy's life. Mercy leaves the prison intending to stay out of trouble and stay in contact with Tricia. Tricia later reveals she has lost contact with Mercy but remains optimistic.

Vee Parker

Yvonne "Vee" Parker (played by Lorraine Toussaint) – The main antagonist of the second season. Described as a street-tough inmate who used to run a drug business, using kids as runners, she returns to jail after a long stint outside. She has a long history with many of the inmates, particularly Red, whom she had beaten ruthlessly when attempting to take over her smuggling business, and Taystee, whom she had taken under her wing from an early age. Vee is ruthless, manipulative and something of a sociopath, more than willing to take on any naive young inmate or criminal and drop them when they are no longer of use to her. Upon returning to prison, she builds up a gang among the black population, many of whom are manipulated by her charming and maternal influence, with the exception of Poussey, who is one of the only inmates with the courage to take her on. She then forms a tobacco operation, and after Red rejects her attempted takeover of her smuggling operation and one of her friends attempts to kill her, begins a gang war with the Caucasian gang. Red almost succeeds in killing her by strangling, but she relents at the last minute and decides to call a truce. However, Vee was only pretending to give up, and instead violently beats Red with a slock (a lock in a sock), sending her to the prison infirmary. Her arrogance and ruthlessness ultimately lead to her downfall when Nichols, Red's second-in-command, steals her supply of heroin, causing her to become paranoid. Her attempt to frame Suzanne for Red's beating causes all of her girls to turn on her, and she manages to escape through Red's supply tunnel. When Vee reaches the main road, Miss Rosa, who has just hijacked a prison van, sees her at the side of the road and, remembering an earlier incident with her, deliberately veers off the road and runs her over, killing her.

Miss Rosa

Rosa "Miss Rosa" Cisneros (played by Barbara Rosenblat; portrayed by Stephanie Andujar in flashbacks) – An older Latina inmate who has been diagnosed with terminal cancer.

In the second-season episode "Appropriately Sized Pots", flashbacks reveal that as a young woman, Rosa was part of a ring of professional bank robbers. After making clean getaways from three successive heists, she made the mistake of impulsively robbing a fourth bank at random which ultimately sent her to prison. The flashbacks also reveal that most of the men she's loved died moments after she kissed them when a job has been successful, which has led her to believe she is cursed.

Throughout the second season, she routinely goes to the nearby hospital for chemotherapy and befriends a teenager who is also on chemo. Eventually, she is told that her cancer is aggressive, and she has between three and six weeks left to live. When they return to the prison, they discover the place is on lockdown. As Officer Ford goes to investigate, Lorna decides to give Rosa the opportunity to steal the prison van and escape, urging her not to die in prison. As she drives away, Rosa sees the escaped Vee at the side of the road and runs her over in revenge for having treated her so rudely.

In the opening of the third season, a CO reveals that, after running Vee down, Rosa committed suicide by driving into a nearby quarry. She appears in a flashback of Caputo's first day working in the prison and is one of the first inmates that he talks to.

The Golden Girls
Irma, and Taslitz (played by Yvette Freeman and Judith Roberts) – "The Golden Girls" are a group of seniors in the prison who befriend Red. They help Red set up the greenhouse and help to grow the plants and with Red's smuggling. Despite appearing to be harmless old ladies, they are actually quite dangerous and hardened — unlike the other inmates, they possess and carry shivs. In one scene, when tasked with taking back Red's merchandise from the kitchen, they calmly threaten Gloria's staff with these weapons. Later, when Red abandons the greenhouse, they feel it's because of Vee, so they plot to kill her. Taslitz volunteers to do the job, and tails a woman she thinks is Vee as she leaves the showers. Upon reaching an empty corridor, she brutally shanks the woman, but it turns out to be the wrong person. Taslitz is sent to the SHU, and Vee takes it as a declaration of war. She is later seen in max.

Other inmates
 Loretta Fisher (played by Cristina J. Huie) – Leanne's friend, and another former follower of Tiffany.
 Emily Germann (played by Tamara Torres) – An inmate who is frequently seen in the background while Piper is on the phone. During the third season, she becomes a part of the cult that follows Norma.
 Jeanie "Babs" Babson (played by Danielle Herbert) — An African-American inmate who is a member of Norma's cult.
 Ginsberg (played by Jamie Denbo) — A Jewish inmate who helps Black Cindy convert to Judaism after talking to her and realizing that Cindy sincerely wants to join her faith.

Litchfield ICE detainees

Shani Abboud
 Shani Abboud (played by Marie-Lou Nahhas) – A detainee from Egypt who is applying for asylum. She replaced Blanca on the kitchen detail while she was at court for her initial deportation hearing. Starting out as friends with Nicky, they begin to get closer, and their relationship becomes romantic. After repeatedly refusing to let Nicky perform oral sex on her, she admits to her that she was forced to undergo female genital mutilation when she was a teenager, which makes sexual intercourse and even urination painful for her. A little while later, when Nicky did not report to the ICE kitchen due to needing to comfort Lorna after she had a breakdown, Shani received a notice that her asylum application has been rejected and that she is scheduled for removal from ICE. In flashbacks, it is revealed that she fled Egypt after a member of her family witnessed her kissing another woman (homosexuality is de facto illegal in Egypt), and her father angrily warned her that he could not protect her from their relatives. After being restrained when she forcibly tried to leave a note for Nicky, she is sedated before being put on a plane back to Egypt.

Karla Cordova
 Karla Cordova (played by Karina Arroyave) – A detainee from El Salvador with two children on the outside. Her husband died a year prior to her detention and she was at risk of losing her children due to her possible deportation. She first appears at a deportation hearing and is sitting next to Blanca. In order to stay in the country longer, she requests to get her hearing delayed so she could get a lawyer. She is informed of a custody hearing for her kids and requests transportation to it but ICE Agent Litvack angrily denies her request. In flashbacks, she is called to her children's school to console her children after they are having trouble grieving the death of their father. During her second hearing, she attempts to use the United Nations Convention against Torture to prevent her deportation to her native El Salvador on the grounds that her two sons may be forced to join gangs or killed upon their return there. Her attempt is denied due to her sons being in foster care and eligible to stay in the United States. Gloria lets her borrow her phone so she can say goodbye to her sons before her deportation. Sometime after she was deported, she is in Mexico with a group of migrants attempting to cross back into the United States illegally so she can get back to her sons. She gets hurt on her way back in and is abandoned by the coyote leading the group into the U.S. The coyote leaves her behind a bush with a jug of water and claims that someone else would come for her.

Santos Chaj
 Santos Chaj (played by Melinna Bobadilla) – A detainee who causes confusion among both the other inmates and the guards due to her only being able to speak the Kʼicheʼ language (a language commonly spoken in the central highlands of Guatemala), which almost everyone in the center is unfamiliar with. While in medical, the doctor reveals that she is pregnant but nobody is able to tell her the status of her pregnancy due to the language barrier. After being ignored and occasionally threatened by the ICE agents, Fig is able to obtain a translator for her, who she informs she doesn't want to keep the child and that she tried to induce a miscarriage. In a flashback, she is in the back of a truck being snuck across the border and it is revealed that the presumed father of her child was one of the coyotes that got her into the U.S., who raped her when she didn't have money to pay their fee to get in the country. Fig requests authorization to have her transported to a woman's clinic for an abortion but Litvack denies the request. Following this, Fig gave her an abortion pill she got from her doctor after claiming she herself was pregnant but wanted to end the pregnancy.

Litchfield staff

Charlie Coates
Charlie "Donuts" Coates (played by James McMenamin) – One of the correctional officers hired after MCC lowers the prison's employment standards. Previously working at a donuts store frequented by O'Neill and Bell, he gets hired as a CO by the prison and becomes friends with Tiffany after being introduced to her for a van errand. During one of their errands, he takes her out to feed ducks and ends up treating her like a dog before kissing her against a tree. He stops kissing her after it is apparent she isn't into it and that it was crossing some boundaries. During another van errand, Coates is late returning to the prison and misses count, causing him to be reprimanded by Caputo and put on probation. Tiffany apologizes for making him late, but he throws her into the prison van and rapes her while repeatedly stating that he loves her. Later, he wakes up in the laundry room, after (unknown to him) being drugged by Tiffany and Big Boo. During another van errand, he tells Tiffany to drive under an underpass, but she fakes a seizure in order to prevent another encounter between them and runs off of the road. Tiffany is relieved of her van duties and Coates meets Maritza, who was assigned to be Tiffany's replacement as the van driver.

During the fourth season, he becomes fed up with Tiffany's cold, hostile attitude towards him and he confronts her over what her issue with him is. After thinking she is jealous of Maritza and telling Tiffany that she is not his type, Tiffany asks him if he is raping Maritza. He denies raping Maritza and then claims that he thought the encounters between him and Tiffany were consensual because he told her he loved her when he did it, but she replies that this didn't make it any different and leaves. Subsequently, Coates struggles to come to terms with the reality of his actions and at one point lashes out at and then kicks Luschek out of his house for his less than caring attitude to Gina when she injures her hand. Eventually, he offers Tiffany an apology, and she decides at the risk of her friendship with Boo to accept and to forgive him, and the two make amends. Later, while guarding the inmates following Poussey's death, he confesses to Tiffany that he is dissatisfied with his job and planning to quit. She attempts to talk him out of it and kisses him, and though he returns the kiss, he stops himself from initiating sex with her, not wanting to make the mistake he made previously, and tells her that he will still go through with his plan to quit.

At the end of the fourth season, the riot prevents him from leaving as planned, but he is able to avoid being captured by the inmates along with the other guards by hiding in the ceiling. He watches Tiffany masturbate with the vibration function of a cell phone before she notices him in the ceiling. Later while they are in the laundry room the two of them start making out until Boo walks in on them, brings her outside the laundry room, and angrily scolds her. Before Tiffany left to talk with Boo, she hides him in a dryer but he ends up being caught by Leanne and Angie before she comes back in. Tiffany steals the gun that Humphrey smuggled in from Angie and she then throws the gun to Coates. The gun went off when Coates caught it, shooting off one of Leanne's fingers, and he then uses the gun to make a break for the exit, finally escaping and taking the weapon with him.

At the end of the fifth season, he comes home to find Tiffany in his house with a gun in her hand and nervously plays along as she gets him to join her watching TV. Following this, in the sixth season, Coates and Tiffany intend to go on a road trip together. Dixon, not knowing that Coates was concealing Tiffany from capture, assumes that he may be planning to commit suicide and invites himself along for the trip to stop him. This forces Tiffany to hide in the trunk of the car, though she later reveals herself to Dixon at a hotel after being tired of hiding in the trunk. Shortly after it is discovered that Linda was mistakenly counted in Tiffany's place after the riot, an alert is sent out for her capture, causing Coates to suggest fleeing with her to Canada. However, Tiffany begins to worry about whether doing so would be in his best interests, while Coates continually tries to plead with her to come with him and to make the relationship work. In doing so, he inadvertently shows signs of his anger management problems and abusive personality, which he has been attempting to repress as a result of the realization that he raped her. While sleeping in the woods and preparing to cross into Canada, Tiffany wakes up before Coates, gives him a goodbye kiss while he sleeps, and slips away to turn herself in, ensuring that his role in helping her escape is never discovered.

Baxter Bayley
Baxter "Gerber" Bayley (played by Alan Aisenberg) – One of the COs hired after MCC took over the prison. He is nicknamed "Gerber" by Alex upon first seeing him due to his young age. On one of his first days on the job, he overreacted when two inmates started arguing over an Uno game and pepper-sprayed them. He ends up accidentally spraying himself and Donaldson when Donaldson attempted to stop him. Piper enlists him into her used panty business, using him to sneak underwear out of the prison so that her brother Cal can sell them on the outside. Later on, he decides that he cannot smuggle underwear out of the prison anymore, which causes Piper to assume that he was waiting for an implied sexual favor from her when it was actually due to stress. Intending to offer Bayley a handjob in exchange for his continued cooperation, Piper is interrupted by Stella, who convinces him to continue smuggling panties out of the prison for the bragging rights on the outside. At the end of the third season, he is running for help when all of the inmates are leaving the prison to swim in the lake and most of the other guards have left for the strike.

During the fourth season, he expresses fear of the new guards and their methods. Flashbacks to his time before working at the prison revealed that he was once arrested for drinking and smoking marijuana on a water tower near the prison and that he was fired from an ice cream shop for giving women he found attractive free ice cream. After telling Caputo about Humphrey forcing Suzanne and Maureen to fight during the lockdown after Aydin's remains are found, Caputo recommends to him that he should quit before working at the prison breaks him. Later, after several guards enter the cafeteria to end a peaceful protest the inmates are doing, Piscatella orders Bayley to restrain Suzanne after the sight of Humphrey causes her to become unhinged. Poussey intervenes, and Bayley restrains her on the floor under his knee while Suzanne repeatedly attacks him until Piscatella grabs her and Coates pulls him off of Poussey. In the confusion, Poussey was unable to breathe, resulting in her suffocating to death. Following this, the traumatized and guilt-ridden Bayley is taken to a quiet corner of the prison with a blanket, and Caputo gives him Valium to help calm him. Later, Piper runs into him on his way to Poussey's dorm to apologize to her friends, and she convinces him that he is the last person they need to see at that moment. She pretends to agree to pass on a message from him, and he is then driven home by Officer Dixon.

Throughout the fifth season, Bayley wrestles with his guilt at killing Poussey and his family's indifference to his feelings and makes numerous attempts to alleviate it. First, he attempts to hand himself in to the police, but they assume that he is a PTSD-suffering war veteran, and they put him in the drunk tank for the night. Next, after speaking to former COs Bell and O'Neill, he attempts suicide by consuming non-toxic paint from his father's workshop. In desperation, he makes the long journey to Poussey's father's house to beg for forgiveness in person. Her father is furious at Bayley over what he did, and bluntly says he will not do anything (forgive him, beat him up, or press charges) that will relieve the guilt Bayley is feeling, and that Bayley's punishment will be to live with his guilt for the rest of his life—a life that will be longer than the one he cut short. A tearful Bayley goes to a bar where he has a conversation with a sympathetic barman, who states that not everywhere is bad, before rattling off a list of places he would go if he had the opportunity. Bayley initially approaches his bus terminal, but then decides not to use his ticket, and instead turns and goes back up the escalator, evidently deciding to leave his old life behind and start afresh somewhere new.

Danny Pearson
Danny Pearson (played by Mike Birbiglia) – The former Director of Human Activities in the prison, which held most of the same responsibilities as the warden before MCC took over the prison. Pearson received the job due to his father's senior position at MCC and as a result, had no real experience or qualifications for his job. One of his first acts was to force Caputo to rush the new hires on the job with inadequate training as a cost-saving measure.

Later on, in the third season, he confronted his father about Sophia's situation after she was attacked and MCC ordered the prison to put her in the SHU due to her threat to sue. Disgusted with the company's actions, he quits his job, and Caputo is promoted to his former position as a result.

During the fourth season, he reappears during a prison show to protest MCC's treatment of the prisoners and to bring attention to their treatment of Sophia. He starts a website to show the corruption that MCC is involved with, to include posting a story stating that MCC bribed a judge to send more people to prison so that they could profit from their incarceration. He helps Crystal get Sophia out of the SHU by posting a picture of her smuggled out of the prison anonymously by Caputo.

Desi Piscatella
Desi Piscatella (played by Brad William Henke) – A guard that previously worked in max. He is a major antagonist in both the fourth and fifth seasons. Piscatella was one of the guards from max that responded when many of minimum security's more experienced guards walked out after MCC took over, and his performance impressed Caputo enough to get him appointed as the new captain of the guards. Piscatella is shown to be very strict, brutal and overzealous with his methods, and becomes very unpopular with the inmates. He calls Piper into his office, and after encouraging her to create a task force to counter suspected gang activity in the prison, he makes it a point to inform her that he is a homosexual in order to discourage her from trying to flirt with him to get her way with him. When Aydin's remains are found, he promptly disobeys Caputo's order not to interrogate any of the inmates until the FBI arrived after he left, and took a blind eye to the abuses the other guards performed. When Caputo attempted to suspend Humphrey for forcing Suzanne and Maureen to fight, Piscatella threatened to pull all of the guards in retaliation. When the inmates protested his actions in the cafeteria by standing on the tables, he ordered the guards to pull them down, which eventually resulted in Bayley accidentally killing Poussey of asphyxiation after Suzanne, unhinged due to Humphrey's actions, attacked Bayley. Afterward, Caputo angrily berates Piscatella for allowing an inmate to die on his watch, and for his flagrant disrespect when he notices that he is chewing gum in the presence of the body. When Piscatella gives his usual arrogant response, Caputo tells him that he has done some digging and that he knows the real reason why he was removed from the men's prison he used to work at, before dismissing him for the weekend, threatening to expose him if he tries to pull the guards.

In the fifth season, upon learning that the prison has broken into a riot, Piscatella returns to the prison and attempts to take charge of the efforts to end the riot, but is mocked by Officer Hopper from max and ignored by the CERT officers that arrived on the scene to take over. Inside, Red digs through Caputo's files and learns the details of the incident that had caused him to be transferred, which is revealed by flashbacks. When he had first started out as a CO in a men's prison, Piscatella - then a naive, relatively gentle and happy-go-lucky young man, had developed romantic feelings for one of his inmates, Wes Driscoll, who had reciprocated. One day, Driscoll was violently beaten and raped by a group of inmates. Piscatella realizes that his relationship with Driscoll had been discovered when the leader of the attacking inmates, Miguel Resado, had walked in on them kissing in the kitchen. His grief and devastation at the attack quickly gave way to anger and a lust for vengeance, resulting in him murdering Resado by handcuffing him under a shower, turning on the hot tap, and leaving Resado to be slowly and agonizingly boiled alive by the scalding water. In the present, upon realizing that the inmates have taken Humphrey's phone and are trying to lure him into the prison, Piscatella loses patience and sneaks in. After successfully kidnapping Blanca, Nicky, Boo, Alex, and Piper and tying them up in a storage closet, he lures Red there and proceeds to torture her, saying that he is doing so because of his belief that all inmates need to be broken. He is stopped by the remainder of Red's crew, who were hiding in Frieda's hidden bunker in the prison's disused swimming pool, who knocks him out with a poisoned dart Frieda had made. A video that Gina took of Piscatella torturing Red and breaking Alex's arm is then uploaded on YouTube, sparking protests outside the prison. Because of his size, Piscatella has to be restrained by a heavy board.

Upon discovering him when seeking refuge for Suzanne in the bunker, an enraged Taystee grabs a gun and puts it to his head. Piscatella manages to persuade her to put the gun down, revealing that killing Resado made him feel no better, and Red decides to release him, to show him that they are better than he thinks. Dumbfounded, Piscatella gives them a nod and leaves the bunker, only to be shot in the head with a non-lethal pepper round at point blank range and killed by one of the CERT officers, who did not recognize him in the smoke and darkness. After CERT leader Herrmann leads his men in covering up the accident to make it look like an inmate killed him, to include shooting him in the head with the gun Taystee threatened him with, she is subsequently charged with and found guilty of Piscatella's murder.

Rick Hopper
Rick Hopper (played by Hunter Emery) – The captain of the guards at Litchfield Max. During the fifth season, he is one of the guards from max that responds to the riot when most of the minimum security guards were taken hostage by the inmates. Following the end of the riot, he welcomes the guards from minimum security that were transferred to max, and he participates in the "Fantasy Inmate" game with the other guards at max. Outside of Litchfield, he begins to date Aleida after catching her selling her weight loss products in the prison parking lot and allows her to move in with him after she was evicted from the apartment she was sharing with Margarita. They have a rough period, where Aleida loses respect for him, but they later reconcile and Hopper starts smuggling drugs into the prison inside of Aleida's containers. Near the end of the sixth season, Piper confides to him that Madison planted drugs on her in an attempt to get her sentence extended. Shortly after that, he receives a fabricated disciplinary report on Piper from Hellman that was done on behalf of Madison. Instead of filing the report, he rips it up and puts Piper on the top of the list for early release due to his own involvement in the drug smuggling and concerns that she may expose it.

During the seventh season, Hopper continues to live with Aleida, and all of Aleida's children moved in with them after she regained custody of them. When Fig is transferred to the ICE detention facility, he attempts to replace her as the new warden, but he ends up being passed over for the job by Ward so Linda can obtain a diversity hire grant for PolyCon. Despite being passed over for promotion, he was forced to take charge over Ward during an incident when the inmates acted out and Ward didn't know how to react. Later in the season, he took custody of Aleida's children after she was arrested and sent back to Litchfield. Near the end of the season, Hopper gets fired after Daya sets him and Aleida up to get caught having sex in the SHU by Ward.

Thomas Humphrey
Thomas "Humps" Humphrey (played by Michael Torpey) – One of the correctional officers hired under MCC's veterans program. A sadistic, mean-spirited bully, he enjoys playing pranks on and otherwise causing trouble with the inmates. After getting wind of Maria's smuggling operation (he can understand Spanish, and overheard a conversation between Maritza and the outside man), he starts paying more attention to Maritza, who was using the prison van for the smuggling operation. He overhears Maritza and Flaca talk about a scenario where they would have to choose between eating dead flies or a live baby mouse and decides to take Maritza into his house and forces her to take part in a real-life version of that choice at gunpoint. During the lockdown, after Aydin's remains are found, he is assigned guard duty over the inmates that are being interrogated. While in the waiting room, he pulls Kasey's chair from under her while she was sleeping, causing her to fall onto the floor. Then, as Suzanne laughs at her, he tries to goad Kasey into fighting her, before Maureen volunteers to fight Suzanne instead after Kasey refuses. Suzanne savagely beats Maureen, sending her to medical, and the following morning Caputo attempted to suspend him for a month for his actions. Piscatella stepped in and threatened to pull all of the guards if Humphrey was suspended, causing Caputo to stand down.

At the end of the fourth season, he smuggles a gun into the prison, claiming that it was for protection after Poussey's death. When the inmates start rioting, he attempts to unholster his gun and is pushed from behind by Maritza, resulting in his gun falling to the ground and being picked up by Daya. He attempts to negotiate with Daya in Spanish, but she shoots him in the leg and tells him that she doesn't speak Spanish. Gloria, determined to prevent Daya from being charged with murder, enlists Pidge's help and takes Humphrey to Sophia's salon with the hope that her medical training from her time as a firefighter will be enough to keep him alive. After stitching the wound, Humphrey is taken to the medical unit, where he is placed between Maureen and Suzanne. When he regains consciousness, he overhears them discussing ways to kill him, and then he starts telling them of various medieval ways that people have been killed, which holds their interest. However, he then suffers a violent stroke and is rushed out of the facility. When alone, Maureen quietly reveals to Suzanne that the stroke had been caused by an air embolism which she herself induced by blowing oxygen bubbles into his IV tube. Humphrey initially survives the stroke but is rendered mute and partially paralyzed. He ultimately dies of his injuries, and his body is discovered abandoned in a broom closet by CERT members when the prison is stormed in the fifth-season finale. Daya subsequently accepts a plea deal for his murder in return for life imprisonment, rather than risk facing the death penalty.

Artesian McCullough
Artesian McCullough (played by Emily Tarver) – A female correctional officer hired under MCC's veterans program. Despite her serious, laconic demeanor, she is considerably kinder and more compassionate than the other veterans. On several occasions, she looked on with disgust at the actions of the other guards against the inmates. She becomes friendly with Maritza, and during a shift change, she gives her some tampons. Later, they discussed Maritza giving her makeup tips. Following Maritza being forced to swallow a mouse by Humphrey, she sees her vomiting and becomes concerned about what may have happened between her and Humphrey, although she does not pursue the matter any further because she has no real idea or knowledge of what happened. When Aydin's remains were found, she offered to help interrogate the inmates about his death, by using some of the extraction techniques she learned while in the military, before being told to stand down by Caputo.

At the end of the fourth season, while she is escorting Judy out of the prison, she ends up being surrounded by inmates reacting to the news about Bayley not being charged with Poussey's death. Following this, she is ordered to lay face down on the floor next to Humphrey by Daya, after Daya picks up the gun Humphrey smuggled into the prison. In the fifth season, she is one of the guards held hostage by the inmates. She is distraught when Maritza and Flaca make her remove her clothes alongside the other guards, having believed that she and Maritza's rapport would spare her this humiliation, though Maritza affectionately plays with her hair and tells her not to be ashamed of her body. Later, she is forced to role-play as an inmate by the African-American group as part of Suzanne's therapy. She is eventually released when Maria helps the guards escape.

In the sixth season, Artesian returns to work and is transferred to max alongside Dixon, Blake, and Luschek. Her lingering posttraumatic stress disorder having been made significantly worse as a result of her ordeal the previous season, she appears haunted and visibly depressed. She shuns socializing with the other guards in favor of driving for Lyft to earn extra money, but initially signs on to their "Fantasy Inmate" game. Artesian also appears to be constantly on edge, particularly around Maria Ruiz, her main tormentor. While tossing Maria's cell, her attitude accidentally triggers Artesian into slapping her across the face. Visibly shaken by her actions, she goes into the bathroom to engage in self-harm by burning herself on the thighs with a cigarette. On another occasion, during kickball practice, the ball bursts loudly, which triggers her, and she shakily calls an end to the practice early. When the inmates advance on her in protest, she violently snaps, pulling out her nightstick and threateningly ordering them onto the ground whilst thumping the walls with it, before CO Stefanovic steps in and calms her down before leading the inmates back to their cells. Later, after CO Tamika Ward mistakes her for someone else and catches her burning her thighs in the bathroom again, she opens up about her PTSD, admitting that, had she been armed, she may have been driven to shoot the inmates instead. At the end of the season prior to the kickball game, Maria attempts to persuade Artesian to make the cell blocks mix teams in an attempt to prevent a planned knife fight. After the initial wariness, McCullough decides to trust her and backs her up by ordering the change.

During the seventh season, Artesian grows increasingly disgusted with Hellman's actions and decides to report him for selling drugs. Luscheck talks her out of it while giving her a ride to work, and she agrees, rationalizing her decision by saying she is part of a team. During flashbacks to her time in the Army, she is criticized for giving advice to Pena, one of her fellow soldiers practicing marksmanship prior to deployment and eventually earns the nickname "Grandma" from her squad. She is then encouraged by her staff sergeant to do whatever it takes to show she is part of the team so she can count on them while they are in combat. While deployed, she paid a female soldier from another company to do a stripshow for Pena's birthday party and after the party, she is sexually assaulted while sleeping by another soldier in her squad. The following day, other members of her squad accuse her of fabricating the incident while the soldier that assaulted her claims nobody will believe her if she reports him to their superiors. After the confrontation, they are ambushed during a mission and she stays in the troop carrier while some of the other soldiers in her squad are shot after dismounting.

Back in the prison, she catches Alex trying to put Hellman's drugs in his locker but decides not to turn her, or Hellman in. Needing money for her car, and under a mountain of debt due to her trouble gaining employment after leaving the Army, Artesian initially attempts to start her own drug smuggling business with Alex, but it becomes clear she doesn't know she's doing. Alex recommends selling portable phone chargers instead, which proves easier. As their operation continues and she spends several moments alone with her in a supply closet, making a transfer, Artesian begins to develop feelings for Alex. Although she does not feel the same way, Alex returns her affections out of sympathy for her clear trauma and emotional pain, and they end up sharing several romantic moments together. Eventually, Artesian pleads with Alex to break up with Piper and be with her instead. Alex refuses, leaving her heartbroken. In a moment of jealousy, Artesian has a confrontation with Piper outside her apartment, having witnessed her with Zelda. When she tries to tell Alex that Piper was seeing someone else, Alex violently warns her not to go near Piper again and terminates both their professional and personal relationship. Following this, Artesian confesses to Tamika - now the Warden - that she is in love with Alex, and requests that Alex gets transferred so that she can keep her job and not have to struggle with seeing her every day.

Lee Dixon
Lee Dixon (played by Mike Houston) – Another correctional officer hired under MCC's veterans program. Shown to be uncaring about the inmates, he loudly suggests to Coates that he should have sex with Maritza while she is driving them to their housing, only to find himself being insulted by her in return. He catches Piper attempting to feed Blanca while she is being forced to stand on the cafeteria table, and he orders her to stand next to her on the table as punishment. During the lockdown caused by the discovery of Aydin's remains, he is approached by Taystee, and after he asks her for the watch Caputo gave her for her duties as his assistant, he dropped it to the floor and crushed it before giving it back. After Bayley accidentally kills Poussey, he was instructed to drive Bayley home. During the drive, in his attempt to console Bayley, he openly admitted to committing several war crimes during his service in Afghanistan he wasn't caught for, to include murdering civilians both in retaliation for the deaths of other troops at the hands of insurgents as well as to cover up other crimes. In the riot, he is stripped naked and violated with a baton by Maria Ruiz's gang, and held hostage alongside the other guards. Eventually, Maria helps him and many of the other guards escape after she decided to take advantage of a furlough deal Jack Pearson promised Gloria to get the guards out.

In the sixth season, he accompanies Coates on a road trip, believing that he was planning to commit suicide and unaware that Coates was actually concealing Tiffany from capture. When she finally reveals her presence, he does not turn them in but instead agrees to continue accompanying them. Later, he defends her and Charlie from two homophobic bullies at an amusement park (Tiffany was disguised as a man) and punches one of them in the face. He eventually leaves them when they see Tiffany's absence has been detected and advertised on the news, encouraging them to escape to Canada. He then returns to Litchfield to work in max and meets up with Tiffany when she returns to prison. During the seventh season, Dixon confronts Maria during a class led by Caputo about his flashbacks from being abused by her during the riot. Near the end of the series, he chastises Luschek after the latter neglects to apply for extra time for Tiffany's GED exam, which eventually leads to Tiffany overdosing because she believed she failed it.

Ryder Blake
Ryder Blake (played by Nick Dillenburg) – Another correctional officer hired under MCC's veterans program. Blake is one of the toughest COs due to his military training. His good looks often make the inmates flirt with him which he enjoys. During the fifth season, he is captured after he is tricked by Frieda into believing she shot him with a poisonous dart. Later, it is revealed that he is quite religious and was a Mormon when he was forced to strip to his temple garments during the riot. He escaped along with the other guards when Maria led them out in an attempt to cash in on Gloria's offer from MCC. In the sixth season, he joins some of the other guards in returning to work after the riot and being transferred to max.

G. Hellman
G. Hellman (played by Greg Vrotsos) – One of the correctional officers at max. Hellman has been one of the more sadistic COs in the prison and has frequently abused his power with the inmates. One of his more sadistic acts was to order Maria and Gloria to kiss each other on the lips for his and CO Garza's enjoyment after handcuffing the two of them in the shower and spraying them off. He also beat Daya on occasion due to her shooting Humphrey during the riot. Near the end of the season, he made a deal with Madison in exchange for oral sex from inmates Charlene Teng and Shruti Chambal to write a falsified report claiming that Piper assaulted her in an attempt to get Piper's sentence extended.

During the seventh season, Hellman continued his abusive behavior to include demanding sexual favors and bringing drugs into the prison. When Madison was put in the SHU, he ordered Alex to sell drugs in her place and he forced her to swallow a condom full of drugs during a contraband search. During another contraband search, he took a bottle of drugs from Daya in exchange for a large portion of the profits so she wouldn't be caught with them. At the end of the season, he was appointed the new warden after Tamika Ward was fired and he proceeded to beat his chair after the arm broke off.

D. Stefanovic
D. Stefanovic (played by Josh Segarra) – Another guard introduced in the sixth season that works in max. He is shown to be very obsessed with his health and is constantly worried about his “gains” to include him interrupting a federal investigation involving Gloria being questioned about the riot in the staff break room in order to cook low-calorie popcorn. Later in the season, when McCollough is triggered by an exploding kickball during kickball practice and threateningly ordered the inmates to get on the ground, he steps in and calms her down before leading the inmates back to their cells. At the end of the season, he is watching the kickball game next to McCollough. After making a comment about losing Fantasy Inmate points over C and D block getting along during the game, he moves closer to her before McCollough promptly tells him no causing him to back away.

B. Stratman
B. Stratman (played by Evan Hall) – Another correctional officer hired under MCC's veterans program. Stratman could go from easygoing and fun, to brute and sadistic when angered. He holds his fellow COs in high regards and even covers for their inappropriate actions, believing them all to be part of a "brotherhood." He confronts Blanca, after complaining about how she smelled and ordered her to bathe. After discovering that she still stunk in the cafeteria, he ordered her to stand on a table in the cafeteria, where she remained until the prison was put on lockdown after Aydin's remains were found. Following the takeover of the prison by the inmates, he is held hostage with the other guards and eventually is forced to perform in a talent show, in which he performed a strip show to the delight of the inmates. Leanne attempts to take Stratman's finger to replace hers after part of her finger was accidentally shot off by Coates while he was escaping. Prior to Leanne being able to take his finger, he offers to let her "try it out" first and then he fingers her, bringing her to orgasm. Later, he is able to flee from Leanne and Angie, and he escapes through an opening in the fence.

Tamika Ward
Tamika Ward (played by Susan Heyward) - A correctional officer at max, who was friends with Taystee prior to her incarceration. Flashbacks reveal that she and Taystee worked at a fast-food restaurant together. One night, when the two were smoking marijuana and getting high while on shift, the restaurant was robbed at gunpoint by Michael Spence, a man Taystee went to school with. Taystee was able to talk Michael down while Ward hid under the counter, and then Taystee gives him her fake Jordans when he couldn't get any money from the register. Later that night the two joked around with each other about the robbery while walking home and she showed Taystee gratitude because she feels that she may have saved her life. At Litchfield, she tries to go easy on Taystee for the sake of their old friendship, and she did do Taystee a favor and delivered a message to Caputo asking for help fighting her murder charge. However, they had a falling out after she overheard Taystee blaming all of the COs for their troubles in the prison during an interview with the media. She catches McCullough burning her legs in the bathroom after mistaking her for another guard, before having a conversation with her about how McCullough's PTSD from being held hostage during the riot is affecting her and her feelings towards the inmates. Also, like several of the other guards, she occasionally participated in the abuse the guards were administering to Daya for shooting Humphrey. Despite the falling out between her and Taystee, she asks for a day off and used the day off to attend her trial the day the verdict was read.

At the beginning of the seventh season, Ward is escorting Gloria out of the SHU and has a conversation about her not being part of the Fantasy Inmate game many of the other guards were participating in and complaining about the conditions in the SHU. After Hopper brags that he's going to replace Fig as warden, she tells Caputo, who is teaching her corrections management night class, that she wants to apply for the head guard position. He gives her advice on how to handle the interview with Linda, but instead of being hired as head guard, Linda makes her the new warden for the purpose of getting PolyCon a diversity hire grant. One of her first acts was to shut down the SHU, and she then tries to improve the prison but is stalled on some of her goals due to PolyCon's budget cuts. She is also caught off-guard when she learns about psych being shut down for the purposes of budget cuts during an interview, but she improvises a response on the spot. At one point, she loses control of the inmates during an incident, resulting in Hopper (who is resentful over her getting the job of warden over him) having to step in. She returns Taystee to her former secretary position and encourages her to fight her murder conviction after finding a letter written by Suzanne she threw away detailing Herrmann leading his men in covering up the true details of Piscatella's death. She agreed to transfer Alex to Ohio at McCollough's request after McCollough confessed that she was in love with Alex. Ward is later forced to fire Hopper after she catches him having sex with Aleida in the SHU and Luschek after he confesses to smuggling cell phones into the prison. She herself was fired by Linda following several incidents in the prison, with the decisive incident being a chicken roaming around the prison dropping a bottle of drugs in front of her shortly after Tiffany died of a drug overdose.

George Mendez
George "Pornstache" Mendez (played by Pablo Schreiber) – A corrupt, perverted, and seemingly psychopathic corrections officer who frequently abused his authority.

During the first season, he seems to be the most ruthless of all the COs and is seen sexually assaulting and humiliating the inmates at every opportunity. His personality can be both laughably exaggerated as well as frightening. Mendez uses his position as a guard to smuggle drugs and contraband into the prison until the prison begins to search the guards as well. He tries to strike a deal with Red to use her connections to smuggle drugs in, but she refuses until he puts more pressure on her. He often trades contraband for sexual favors with the inmates and is the one who supplies Tricia with the drugs that eventually kill her via an overdose. He covers up Tricia's overdose to make it look like she hanged herself instead. He is put on unpaid leave after he is caught having sex with Daya in a closet. Mendez is shown to be in love with Daya and often sends her love letters anonymously after he leaves Litchfield.

In the second season, Figueroa rehires Mendez to fill in for Fischer after she is fired and he immediately continues his arrogant and antagonizing demeanor toward the prisoners. When Bennett tells Caputo that Daya is pregnant, Caputo assumes Mendez is the father and uses it as an excuse to have him arrested in front of the inmates and reporters.

During the third season, Mendez is seen in a men's prison talking to his mother Delia about his love for Daya and how it is keeping him going in prison. She tells him that he isn't the father of Daya's unborn child, but he is in denial, stating that he knows that he is the father. Following this, Delia decides to drop the subject.

During the fifth season, Mendez is living with his mother while on parole. After Daya calls Delia to offer her the chance to adopt her child, Mendez realizes Daya is on the phone and begs his mother for a chance to talk to her. Delia reminds Mendez that talking to her would violate his parole and prevents him from doing so. Mendez makes one more appearance at the end of the seventh season playing with Daya's daughter in his kitchen.

John Bennett
John Bennett (played by Matt McGorry) – A correction officer and a former soldier. He starts a secret friendship with Daya that eventually turns into a romantic relationship. He has an artificial leg, which Daya discovers before performing oral sex on him in a utility closet. Although the other inmates believe he lost his leg while in combat, he admits to Aleida and Daya that he lost his leg to an infection he got from a cut in a dirty hot tub. He eventually gets Daya pregnant, and he finds out that Daya seduced Mendez to have sex with her so Mendez can be blamed for the pregnancy.

During the second season, when Mendez is returned to the prison after his suspension for having sex with Daya, Bennett becomes outraged and uncharacteristically takes out his rage on Vee's gang. He then drags one of Daya's friends to the SHU when she tries to blackmail him. He attempts to continue his relationship with Daya in secret, but she believes that he should confess the relationship and serve time in prison for it, so that they may be together when they both complete their sentences. Regardless, the two share a number of romantic moments together, despite the situation. Eventually, he confesses to Caputo that he is the father of Daya's child. Caputo, not wanting another scandal two days into his trial period, tells him not to tell anybody else, or he will send Daya to max, where she may have to give birth in shackles.

During the third season, Caputo continues to berate him for getting Daya pregnant. Despite this, Bennett proposes to Daya and intends to marry her after she is released. However, he is shaken from his intentions after a visit with Cesar, during which Cesar reveals himself to be abusive and points a gun at his son during dinner. Cesar gives Bennett Daya's childhood crib, but later Bennett ends up abandoning the crib on the side of the road before driving off and moving away. In flashbacks to his deployment in Afghanistan, he befriended Farzad, a member of the Afghan National Police, while filming a humorous parody video of Hollaback Girl with his unit to pass time. Later, Farzad discovered that some of his colleagues were about to execute an insider attack on Bennett's unit. He rushed into Bennett's tent to warn him, only to be shot dead by another soldier after yelling "bomb" and being mistaken for an attacker. Following this, the real attackers throw a grenade in Bennett's tent and he is last shown lying in the corner while another soldier jumps on top of the grenade.

Susan Fischer
Susan Fischer (played by Lauren Lapkus) – A rookie prison guard, Fischer used to bag groceries at a shop that Piper frequented in college and recalls how Piper used to be a difficult customer. However, she is friendly toward Piper, informing her that she does not think any less of her for being in prison since the only difference between them is that Fischer didn't get caught making mistakes. Piper appreciates her kind words and convinces her to suggest the reopening of the prison track. She displays a perpetually naive and cheerful demeanor, which endears some (especially Caputo) and irritates others. She struggles to come across as authoritative and strict, and her attempts to appear tough do not appear to intimidate any of the inmates in the slightest. On occasion, they even admonish Susan in return.

Caputo seems to have a romantic interest in her, but it is revealed in the first-season finale that Susan has a boyfriend.

In the second season, Nicky, while having a competition with Boo, begins hitting on her. Susan is initially oblivious, believing Nicky is just being friendly until she makes her move and directly offers to have sex with her. Caught completely by surprise, she angrily brushes her off. Caputo, meanwhile, tries repeatedly to impress her with things like his hobby of playing in a band, but when he realizes she will never return his feelings, he gives up, and when Susan lashes out at him for enforcing Figueroa's harsh measures, he fires her in frustration. Before she leaves, she finds Nicky smoking in the chapel but declines to admonish her since she was already fired. Seeing she is upset, Nicky offers her sympathy, and she jokes that she did consider her suggestion to have sex before ultimately deciding against it. Nicky, in turn, advises her that getting fired may be the best thing that happened to her since being a prison guard did not suit her. The two appear to have parted on good terms.

During the seventh season, Susan posts the story of the circumstances of her firing, and Caputo's crush on her, on Facebook as part of the Me Too movement. Later, Caputo ignores all advice given to him and tries to appeal to her personally before criticizing her work performance, which just makes things worse. Following Caputo's visit, Fischer names him online and files a restraining order against him.

Scott O'Neill
Scott O'Neill (played by Joel Marsh Garland) – An overweight and generally good-natured prison guard in a relationship with Wanda Bell. He is frequently shown eating, despite claiming to be on different fad diets. During the second-season finale, he is assigned to watch a group of nuns protesting outside the gate and taunts them with songs and insults about his own unhappy Catholic-school upbringing. In the third season, he gets into a verbal confrontation with Coates in his donuts shop after being offered red velvet donuts. Later, he becomes upset when he sees that Coates is applying to work at the prison. At the end of the third season, he was one of the guards that walked out after Caputo shut down the guard's union. During the fourth season, Donaldson mentions him when confronting Caputo at a restaurant, telling him that he heard O'Neill failed to seek treatment for kidney stones due to not having health insurance and is on dialysis as a result, with the possibility of losing a kidney. He then makes another appearance in the fifth season, when Bayley turns to him and Bell after he is overcome with grief due to his part in Poussey's death. He attempts to give Bayley some words of encouragement, but it has little effect on him. O'Neill appears as a guard for PolyCon's ICE detention facility in the seventh season.

Wanda Bell
Wanda Bell (played by Catherine Curtin) – A prison guard in a relationship with O'Neill, Bell is gruff, apathetic, and has little patience for inmates who waste her time, are unreasonable, or annoy her. Nonetheless, she tends to be the most professional of the guards and takes her work seriously, especially the occasional visits from the Scared Straight program. During these visits, she displays a much deeper insight into individual inmates' histories and personalities than the other guards. For example, she specifically requests Tricia and later Piper to scare an unusually resistant, delinquent adolescent wheelchair user, aware that their more philosophical natures will be more effective in reaching the girl. At the end of the third season, she walks out of the prison along with the other guards protesting Caputo's attempt to shut down their union. During the fourth season, she gets a job as a school crossing guard. She makes another appearance in the fifth season next to O'Neill when Bayley needed someone to turn to after he accidentally killed Poussey. During Bayley's visit, it is revealed that she is pregnant. When Bayley expresses his desire to die she tells him not to say that anymore and warns him that he may end up in a psychiatric hospital if he keeps mentioning his suicidal desires. Bell appears as a guard at PolyCon's ICE detention facility in the seventh season. At one point, she overhears Gloria's phone ringing when one of Karla Cordova's sons calls her phone, and reports it to her superiors.

Eliqua Maxwell
Eliqua Maxwell (played by Lolita Foster) – The first guard Piper meets when she arrives at the prison in the first season. She was on duty as the receptionist for new prisoners turning themselves in. She is one of the COs who subdues Miss Claudette when she is choking Fischer.

At the end of the third season, she was one of the guards that walked out on Caputo when he attempted to shut down the guard's union created in response to the benefits that were cut when MCC took over the prison.

Charles Ford
Charles Ford (played by Germar Terrell Gardner) – One of the COs at the prison. He was shown escorting Miss Rosa to one of her chemotherapy appointments and he escorted Christopher out of the visitor's room after he began to yell at Lorna during a visit.

During the third season, he was one of the COs that confronted Caputo about the reduced benefits and hours the other guards were getting when MCC took over the prison. When Caputo was promoted to replace Pearson when he quit, he was the first CO to walk out when Caputo tried to shut down their union.

During the seventh season, he sends Caputo a link on Facebook Messenger to a story accusing him of sexually harassing former CO Fischer.

Wade Donaldson
Wade Donaldson (played by Brendan Burke) – A somewhat cranky and curmudgeonly guard who is perpetually worn-out by the antics of the inmates that he has to deal with. Nevertheless, he is surprisingly compassionate and good at dealing with difficult situations - on one occasion, he manages to help Daya recover from a panic attack almost immediately after discovering that she is having one, despite Bennett having spent ages trying to calm her.

In the third season, he was assigned to help train new guard Baxter Bayley on the job when Pearson orders Caputo to cut their mandatory 40 hours of training short and ends up accidentally being pepper-sprayed when Bayley overreacts to a confrontation between two inmates. Later, he becomes embarrassed at the discovery that he is the basis for one of the characters in Suzanne's erotic tales.

At the end of the season, he joins most of the other veteran guards by going on strike when Caputo shuts down the newly organized staff union.

During the fourth season, he is seen working as a busboy at a restaurant Caputo and Linda visited. After Caputo tried to give him an anonymous tip, he confronted him, claimed that he was working three jobs, and told him he didn't want his money, only for Caputo to scold him and state that the walkout put the town in danger.

Berdie Rogers
Berdie Rogers (played by Marsha Stephanie Blake) – A prison counselor introduced in the third season. She takes a different approach than Healy in counseling troubled inmates and starts a drama class, which causes friction between her and Healy. She tells Alex that she wants to make a difference in the prison system, which Alex considers noble but futile. During drama class, Rogers pairs Alex and Piper together to perform an improv in a grocery store and the scene ends up causing them to release some of their tensions they were holding in. She also helps Brook and encourages her not to take antidepressants that were prescribed to her by Healy. She encourages Suzanne to write stories, which results in her creating erotic stories based on Donaldson that circulated around the prison. Caputo finds out about Suzanne's stories and puts Rogers on probation, which eventually turns into an indefinite suspension.

Aydin Bayat
Aydin Bayat (played by Juri Henley-Cohn) – One of Kubra Balik's enforcers. He is first seen in flashbacks featuring Alex in a nightclub. Later, he is seen killing Fahri, another one of Kubra's employees in his drug cartel, for allowing a professional working for Kubra to get arrested in Paris after failing to pick her up from the airport. Following Alex's return to Litchfield after her parole violation, Aydin applies for a job at Litchfield as a CO in order to get closer to her. Aydin confronts Alex alone in the prison greenhouse and attempts to choke her to death, under orders from Kubra to punish her for her testimony at his trial in Chicago, but is knocked unconscious by Lolly. Later that night, he is smothered to death by Alex after she finds him still breathing but paralyzed and his remains are buried in the prison garden the following morning.

Other prison guards
 Kowalski (played by Hamilton Clancy) – A former guard at minimum security introduced in the second season. After Caputo took over as warden, he was one of the COs that walked out in protest.
 Erin Sikowitz (played by Eden Malyn) – A CO introduced during the third season after MCC takes over the prison, she is first seen participating in sexual harassment and self-defense training with the other new hires. Later, when Sophia is attacked in the prison salon, Sikowitz is the first CO on the scene. Due to her inexperience, she flees after telling Sophia that she was going to get Caputo, allowing Sophia's assault to continue. Despite demands from Sophia for Caputo to fire her, her job is spared.
 J. Alvarez (played by Nicholas Webber) – Another CO at max. He serves as the organizer of the Fantasy Inmate game and he declares CO Copeland the winner of the game after the two walk up on Barb and Carol's bodies. In the seventh season, he organizes the chicken program for the neuro-atypical inmates.

Other characters

Polly Harper
Polly Harper (played by Maria Dizzia) – Piper's best friend of many years on the outside. Polly and Piper started a business together, which Polly ran while Piper was in prison. Polly is pregnant at the beginning of the series and is upset at Piper for getting herself locked up. She begins cutting Piper out of their business after Piper misses a conference call they were supposed to make together. Flashbacks reveal that Polly was supportive of Piper exploring her sexuality, but disliked Alex and found Piper's taste in romantic partners of either sex horrendous. After Piper and Larry's break-up, she is seen to spend more and more time with Larry, as her husband Pete leaves her alone with her newborn. She eventually begins an affair with Larry, and she leaves Pete for Larry.

In the seventh season, it is revealed that Polly and Larry are still together and live in the house he formerly shared with Piper. During a dinner Larry and Polly have with Piper and Zelda, she reveals to them that she is pregnant with Larry's child.

Pete Harper
Pete Harper (played by Nick Stevenson) – Polly's Australian husband and a friend of Larry and Piper. A running gag is that most characters dislike him to varying degrees and are confused about why Polly married him. He is seen to be somewhat annoying, selfish, and flighty, especially when he leaves on a trip of self-discovery shortly after his son was born. He also has a macho streak, shown when he punches Larry for having sex with Polly.  Soon afterward, he leaves Polly, who states that Pete is happy to be relieved of the responsibilities of marriage and fatherhood.

Carol and Bill Chapman
Carol Chapman and Bill Chapman (played by Deborah Rush and Bill Hoag) – Piper's affluent, appearance-conscious parents. Carol, catty and seemingly humorless, doesn't seem as supportive as Piper thinks she should be, and their visitations are usually awkward. She is rather formal and conventional, treating Piper's prison stay as a shame upon the family (and herself).  On the other hand, Bill is outwardly supportive of his daughter but causes a rift with Piper when he refuses to visit her in prison, because "he doesn't want to see his daughter that way".

In the second season, it is revealed that Bill had an affair with another woman during Piper's childhood, but the family glossed it over and he remained married to Carol.

In the seventh season, Bill reappears after Piper is released on parole from Litchfield. He agrees to give Piper a job with his company after she was fired from the Thai restaurant she was working at. Near the end of the season, Bill meets Zelda and encourages Piper to pursue a relationship with her before Piper eventually declined.

Cal and Neri Chapman
Cal Chapman and Neri Chapman (played by Michael Chernus and Tracee Chimo) – Piper's younger brother and sister-in-law. Piper and Cal's parents long favored the high-achieving Piper and let Cal become a sarcastic, underachieving slacker, a lifestyle he was more than content with. Upon her incarceration, their parents begin placing new expectations on him to make something of his life, much to his dismay. Cal is friends with Larry, who often visits him at his trailer in the middle of nowhere, which he eventually shares with his hippie girlfriend (and later wife) Neri. In addition, after falling out with her parents, Cal becomes Piper's only point of contact with her family.

In the second season, he and Neri marry at his grandmother's funeral.

In the third season, Cal agrees to help Piper with her used panty business as her partner on the outside. Later, he admits to her that Neri is trying to make extra money by selling knock-off panties using a solution to simulate the odor along with the ones coming from the prison, which causes Piper to become upset and claim that his wife is "diluting" the brand.

During the fourth season, Cal tells Piper that Neri is pregnant and that he started a new business to supplement their income after Piper's used panty business fell through.

At the end of the sixth season, Cal arrives at Litchfield to pick Piper up following her early release, and the two allow Piper to move in with them while she is on parole. They encourage Piper to adhere to their attempt to have a zero-waste house and are trying to get their new baby to use the bathroom in the kitchen sink. Later in the season, Cal gives Piper “Bloobs” which contain marijuana and encourages her to try and contaminate her drug test, but his advice to beat the drug test almost causes Piper to get sent back to jail for a parole violation.

Howard and Amy Bloom
Howard Bloom and Amy Kanter-Bloom (played by Todd Susman and Kathryn Kates) – Larry's parents. Though he is her lawyer, Larry's dad dislikes Piper and feels that Larry is making a mistake by being with her. They own the home where Larry is living and let him slide on the rent. Howard wants Larry to find a real job and encourages him to lie to Piper about who really named her in her criminal case.

In the second season, Howard advises Piper to tell the truth about the kingpin in her and Alex's case, but she does not heed his advice, and instead lies for Alex.  This causes Howard to remove himself as Piper's counsel and she is hereafter represented by others in the firm.

Crystal Burset
Crystal Burset (played by Tanya Wright) – Sophia's wife Crystal was supportive of Sophia's transition and even helped her find her feet as a woman, but attempted to persuade her not to have gender confirmation surgery. Ultimately, Crystal felt it was better for her son to have a father who was there for him, even if it was in a dress. She sometimes visits Sophia in prison and updates her on their son. Crystal refuses to smuggle in hormones for Sophia when the prison cuts her dosage. Later on, Crystal becomes close to the new pastor of her church, sparking Sophia's jealousy. Sister Ingalls convinces her that this is about Crystal's needs and not about Sophia or their son, and Sophia eventually gives her blessing for Crystal to act on her interest.

During the third season, she agrees to allow Gloria's son to ride with her for their weekly visits with Sophia but she ends this practice after it appears that Gloria's son is a bad influence to her son.

During the fourth season, she repeatedly seeks out Caputo, in an attempt to find out what is going on with Sophia after all communication is cut off when she is sent to the SHU. She confronts Caputo on his property, and eventually forced off at gunpoint by his girlfriend and MCC employee Linda. After Danny received a photo of Sophia in the SHU, she appeared with him at MCC headquarters and used copies of the photo to force the company to release Sophia from the SHU.

At the end of the sixth season, Crystal and her son picked up Sophia from Litchfield after she is released early.

James Washington
James Washington (played by Thaddeus Daniels) – A general officer in the United States Army, and Poussey's father. In flashbacks, he is a major stationed at United States Army Garrison Hohenfels, Germany with Poussey, and working under German officer Jürgen Mertensacker. Poussey falls in love with Jürgen's daughter Franziska, and shortly after Jürgen discovers their relationship, James receives orders to leave Germany. Prior to their departure, he prevents Poussey from pulling a gun on Jürgen, before defending her sexuality to him.

In the present, he is seen visiting Poussey while in his Army uniform in the visitor's center during the first season, and he receives a phone call from Caputo at the end of the fourth season informing him of Poussey's death before Caputo goes on the air to read his prepared statement from MCC. A few days later, he receives a visit from a remorseful Bayley, but he tells Bayley that he will not do anything to help him address his guilt and that he hopes he never has a day of peace again.

Jürgen Mertensacker
Jürgen Mertensacker (played by Stephan Lee Anderson) – An Oberstleutnant in the German Army, who was James Washington's superior officer while he was stationed in Germany, and the father of Poussey's German girlfriend Franziska. He is shown to be homophobic, and it is heavily implied that he was involved in getting Poussey's father reassigned out of Germany after her relationship with his daughter was discovered. Prior to their departure, he ends up engaging in a verbal altercation with Poussey over her father being reassigned, where she tries to pull a gun on him but is stopped by her father before the gun is visible. Following this, he recommends conversion therapy for Poussey to her father, but he defends her sexuality and says that there is nothing wrong with her.

Franziska Mertensacker
Franziska Mertensacker (played by Nina Rausch) – Jürgen Mertensacker's daughter, and Poussey's girlfriend while her father was stationed in Germany. She is first seen at a party having a rolling paper competition with Poussey, before becoming affectionate with her after losing. Later on, she is having sex with Poussey in her room before being caught by her father, who walked in on them in the middle of the act. Following this, she becomes upset when Poussey's father was reassigned outside of Germany, and begs to go with them. Poussey initially pushes back and claims that their relationship was just casual, but she later admits to Jürgen while drunk that she loves her.

Diablo
Diablo (played by Miguel Izaguirre) – Blanca's boyfriend. During the first season, he would have secret conversations with Blanca on her hidden cell phone in the bathroom (the other prisoners assumed she was insane and talking to herself) and would exchange explicit photos with her. Their cell phone exchanges ended after Piper took the phone and gave it to Healy, which caused Blanca to have a breakdown and get sent to psych. Near the end of the fifth season, he is standing next to Leanne's mother behind a barrier outside of the prison and he tells her he's part of the Church of Satan after she asked him about his cross tattoo. During the sixth season, he and Blanca decided to have a child and he attempted to impregnate her with a condom full of his sperm, but she was unable to become pregnant through this method. At the end of the season, he is awaiting Blanca's release from prison so they could try again in person, but unknown to him Blanca was immediately detained by ICE after she was released from Litchfield.

During the seventh season, it is revealed in flashbacks that Blanca called Diablo from an ICE detention center in Arizona to let him know that she was detained. Discouraging him from driving to Arizona, Diablo was able to see her when she was moved to the Litchfield detention facility and let her know that an immigration attorney he hired found out her Green Card was revoked due to her guilty plea for the riot. During his visit, ICE ran his name and discovered his Green Card had expired, which resulted in him being detained and eventually deported to Honduras. Blanca flew to Honduras to visit him after she successfully got her conviction for participating in the riot overturned, which resulted in her Green Card being reinstated.

Yadriel
Yadriel (played by Ian Paola) – Maria's boyfriend at the beginning of the series. Flashbacks reveal that he met Maria when he was fleeing from the police and he threw a bag of drugs into the bushes that she hid for him. Revealed to be soft-spoken, he is surprised when Maria challenges him to a boxing match at his gym, and after Maria accidentally hits him in the face the two click and go out together. Later, he lets Maria move in with him after she had a falling out with her father over her relationship with him. Sometime before Maria arrives in prison she becomes pregnant with Pepa and he takes custody of her after Maria gives birth. Over time, he becomes worried about how Maria's incarceration would affect Pepa's development, especially when she was scheduled to be transferred out of state before her transfer was canceled. This eventually resulted in him making the decision to stop bringing Pepa to the prison during the third season, which devastated Maria. Despite his decision, he brings Pepa with him to the prison at the end of the fifth season to see Maria at the conclusion of the riot. During the seventh season, he starts dating another woman also named Maria (nicknamed "New Maria"), which initially enrages Maria. Flashbacks reveal that unknown to Yadriel Maria was cheating on him prior to her arrest with another man around the time Pepa was conceived, making it unclear if Yadriel is actually Pepa's biological father. Despite this, he continued to care for Pepa and at the end of the seventh season, he brought Pepa and New Maria to the prison for a visit with Maria.

Cesar Velazquez
Cesar Velazquez (played by Berto Colon) – Aleida Diaz's boyfriend and a drug dealer. He is shown using Diaz's kitchen to cut and package drugs for sale. Aleida admits that she is in prison for taking the rap for him, and sometime after she was arrested Daya started sleeping with him. Despite this, it is clear he cares deeply for Daya and Aleida.

In the first season, after Aleida contacts him about Daya's pregnancy, he immediately comes upstate, turns up unexpectedly at Bennet's house and vets him for fatherhood, warning him that he will need a larger house with more room, and to start saving his money.

In the third season, he invites Bennett to his house for dinner and shows him his new girlfriend Margarita and his baby with her. During Bennett's time there, he shows his abusive side by pointing a gun at his son to discipline him. Before Bennett leaves, he gives him Daya's childhood crib for his unborn child with her, which Bennett later abandoned on the side of the road. Several weeks after Bennett disappears, Cesar breaks into his house to look for him and he promises Daya that he will kill him if he ever sees him again. After Daya gives birth, he takes custody of her child, but the child is taken by Child Protective Services after the DEA raids his apartment and arrests him.

Cesar reappears outside of prison in the seventh season, where he is having sex with Aleida inside of a Ford Fusion. He states that he moved back in with Margarita and her mother after he got out of jail. When Aleida tells him she wants to break up with Hopper and move back in with him, he encourages Aleida to stay with Hopper for the time being so they could take advantage of his money and him smuggling drugs into the prison.

Margarita
Margarita (played by Karina Ortiz) – Cesar's new girlfriend after Aleida was sent to prison, and the mother of his youngest daughter. She is first seen when Bennett comes to visit Cesar in the third season, and Bennett is instructed not to mention her to Aleida or Daya. She is present when Cesar's home is raided by the DEA at the end of the third season.

During the fourth season, she picks up Aleida from prison when she was released on parole, and took her out to a restaurant before revealing that Cesar got her pregnant. She got into an argument with Aleida in a clothing store after she admitted that she wasn't planning to stay faithful to Cesar while he was in prison. Despite the argument, she ends up allowing Aleida to stay with her, and at the end of the fourth season, she is watching Caputo's announcement of Poussey's death with her.

During the sixth season, she is still allowing Aleida to live with her, although she constantly complains about her inability to pay her half of the rent. Later, she is evicted, stating that the landlord sent his wife so she could not offer him a handjob as a stalling tactic like in previous eviction attempts. She then tells Aleida that her mother is coming with a U-Haul truck to pick her up and that she was now on her own.

Jean Baptiste
Jean Baptiste (played by James McDaniel) – Jean originally brought Miss Claudette to the U.S. and set her up at the cleaning company. He later broke her heart by marrying another woman but briefly reconnected with Miss Claudette after his wife's death.

Delia Mendez-Powell
Delia Mendez Powell (played by Mary Steenburgen) – Mendez's mother. She comes to the prison at the request of Aleida to discuss Daya's child under the assumption that she is the child's paternal grandmother. She plans to adopt the baby after she is born and mentions that Mendez was the "bad" child, with her other two sons growing up to be a dentist and an art historian. Eventually, Daya tells Delia that Mendez isn't the baby's father but that she still wants to give the baby up for adoption. Delia tries to tell her son during a prison visit, but he is immediately in denial, refusing to accept the fact that he wasn't the father of Daya's child. Shortly after the baby is born, Aleida calls her and tells her that the baby died during childbirth, although this was a ruse in order to give the baby to Cesar instead.

During the fifth season, her son is living with her while he is out on parole. Prior to Daya surrendering for shooting Humphrey, she calls Delia and tells her that her child is alive and well, but she needs a good family to stay with. Daya once again offers her the chance to adopt her child, and Delia tells her that she will do so.

Vince Muccio
Vincent "Vince" Muccio (played by John Magaro) – Lorna's pen pal and later husband. During their first encounter, Lorna confuses details about Vince with some of the other men she was writing, causing an awkward situation before Vince states that he is okay with her writing other men. As the two come closer, Lorna tells him about her former obsession Christopher, causing Vince to take some of his friends to his house to teach him a lesson. Vince comes to the prison intending to break up with Lorna and she proposes in response, which he accepts. The two get married in the prison's visiting center and have sex for the first time on a vending machine while Officer Bell is standing guard in the other room.

During the fourth season, he admits to Lorna that he still lives with his parents. He starts to communicate with Lorna less frequently, sometimes going several weeks without visiting. Eventually, he finds himself being accused of cheating due to his lack of communication with Lorna. When Lorna initially tells him she's pregnant during the fifth season, he deserts her because he thinks she's lying about the pregnancy. Eventually, he receives a call from Nicky, who confirms that Lorna really is pregnant, which prompts him to return to her.

After Lorna gives birth, he takes custody of their son Sterling, but Sterling ends up dying of pneumonia. Vince tells Lorna that Sterling died, but she becomes delusional and insists that he is still alive. Due to Lorna's delusions, he was forced to report the social media accounts she created of Sterling that were made of baby pictures she found on the internet to get them taken down. Eventually, he gets so frustrated over Lorna's denial that he decides that he needs to divorce her. Before he takes that step, he talks to Nicky and lets her know what happened (Lorna told Nicky Sterling was still alive and Vince was keeping their son away from her) so she could try and get her to accept their son is dead.

Kubra Balik
Kubra Balik (played by Eyas Younis) – The leader of the international drug cartel Alex worked for prior to the start of the series. In flashbacks, he first appears sitting by a pool Alex, Piper, and Fahri are in before taking a phone call and appearing visibly upset after the call. Later, he ordered his hitman Aydin to kill Fahri after he failed to pick up one of his employees from the airport in Paris resulting in her arrest, and he offered to send Alex to a rehab center after Fahri's death. In the second season, he was in Chicago on trial, and he was acquitted after Piper and Alex gave the court contradicting testimony, with Piper lying and Alex telling the truth and being immediately released from prison as a result. After Kubra gained his freedom, it was presumed that he would seek revenge on Alex for her testimony. In the third season, after Alex was returned to prison for violating her parole, he sent Aydin into the prison as a CO in order to kill her. Following Aydin's failure to kill her, he is led to believe that Alex is dead when he received a picture of her feigning death and he then asks for a topless photo of her at the beginning of the fourth season.

Fahri
Fahri (played by Sebastian LaCause) – One of Kubra Balik's employees. Fahri first meets Alex shortly after she meets with her father and he ends up introducing her to Kubra's drug cartel.

In flashbacks during the third season, he offers Alex a ride after she attended her mother's funeral, later telling her that Kubra sent him to the U.S. to look for more business. In Paris, Fahri was supposed to pick up a professional at the airport, but Alex convinces him to stay at a nightclub with her instead. Later, he finds out that the professional was arrested and he becomes fearful of Kubra's retaliation for the arrest. While in a hotel room with Alex and Aydin, he is shot to death by Aydin after Aydin received orders from Kubra to kill him from a hotel employee. Kubra later reveals to Alex that he did not kill Fahri solely for his mistake at the airport, which was merely his tipping point, but because he was becoming careless, lazy and a liability.

Jack Pearson
Jack Pearson (played by Michael Bryan French) – A senior executive of PolyCon Corrections (formally the Management and Correction Corporation) and Danny Pearson's father. Like many other MCC executives, he has been shown to be particularly uncaring about the conditions the prisoners were facing and was in favor of cutting corners to save money. He made his son Danny the Director of Human Activities at Litchfield, but Danny later quits in disgust due to MCC's harsh treatment of Sophia in response to her threat to sue, resulting in him promoting Caputo into Danny's old position. During the riot in the fifth season, he receives a call from Gloria after Caputo told her to call him due to her son being in the hospital, and Jack promised her that she would be able to see her son if she helps the guards that were being held hostage escape. At the beginning of the sixth season, he promotes Linda Ferguson to Senior Vice President and triples her salary in order to prevent her from suing MCC and selling the story about her false imprisonment during the riot to the press.

Linda Ferguson
Linda Ferguson (played by Beth Dover) – An MCC employee that worked in purchasing. During a meeting at MCC, she agrees with Caputo's suggestion of using military veterans to replenish the shortage of guards because of the tax breaks the company would receive. She starts a relationship with Caputo and frequently showed him that she is more concerned with financial breaks she can get for the company than the welfare of the prisoners, and later admits that she never set foot in a prison. During a night at Caputo's house, when Crystal came over to ask about Sophia's well-being, she forced her off of Caputo's property at gunpoint. At the end of the fourth season, she visits the prison for the first time when Caputo is about to do the press release announcing Poussey's death, and she is in the bathroom when the women start rioting.

At the beginning of the fifth season, she becomes trapped in the prison with the rioting inmates that have taken the guards hostage. Piper and Alex find her hiding in the bathroom and give her a prison uniform to help her blend in and pose as a white-collar criminal. When Piper and Alex attempted to leave her to fend for herself, she threatens to tell MCC what she overheard Alex say about her involvement in Aydin's death, angering Piper but resulting in Piper and Alex allowing her to stay with them.  During flashbacks, Linda was being hazed while trying to join a sorority by the sorority leader Meg. Later, during a party, Linda is outside with an intoxicated Meg while she is attempting to use the bathroom in freezing temperatures and decides to leave her alone. The following morning, Meg is found frozen to death, and after Linda lies about being the last person to see her alive, she takes over as leader of the sorority. Back in the prison, she becomes attached to Big Boo for both protection and for sexual intercourse. While sharing an intimate moment with Big Boo in the bathroom Linda's phone falls on the floor and she discovers pictures of her and Caputo in it after unlocking it. After a failed attempt to extort $5,000 from Linda for her silence, Big Boo tells the other inmates while they are in the cafeteria that she is the MCC employee responsible for their substandard living conditions for the purpose of budget cuts, resulting in the other prisoners attacking her with several projectiles. After the CERT officers breached the prison and bought the inmates outside, she attempted to announce herself as an undercover MCC employee. However, Big Boo immediately led other inmates into claiming to be MCC employees as well, resulting in Linda's declaration being dismissed as false. Following this, she is forced to board a bus with the other inmates.

In the sixth season, a few days after the riot Linda is in an Ohio facility preparing to get her hair cut per the policy of that facility. Two COs come to the barbershop and identify her as an MCC executive, but not before her hair was already cut off to the delight of Big Boo and Ouija. After her release, she gives MCC senior executive Jack Pearson an ultimatum to either promote her to Senior Vice President, give her a bonus, and triple her salary or she will sell the story to the press and sue MCC for her false imprisonment. Following her promotion, she meets with Fig, which allows them to discover that her presence in the prison caused a miscount that allowed Tiffany's escape to go undetected. Confronting Caputo for not identifying her as an MCC employee during the riot, she reassigns him as warden of a facility in Missouri, but he ends up quitting after she berates him for trying to help Taystee fight her murder charge instead of protecting MCC. She then goes to Sophia and offers her a $300,000 settlement and an immediate release from prison in exchange for her silence on her mistreatment. At the end of the season, she reveals that MCC, now renamed PolyCon Corrections, is about to start its next endeavor of running immigration detention centers.

During the seventh season, Linda transfers Fig from max to their new immigration detention facility on Litchfield. She then does interviews with the guards for a new head guard to replace Hopper, who she originally intended to replace Fig as the warden. Instead, she decided to make Ward the new warden for the purpose of getting PolyCon a diversity hire grant while keeping Hopper in his current position. Over the course of the season, she continues to show no regard for the inmates nor for the ICE detainees, boasting about the money they get for each detainee they hold, and she arranged for the psych ward to be shut down so PolyCon could save at least two million a year. At the end of the season, she fired Ward after she witnessed one of the chickens defecate a bottle full of drugs and hired Hellman in her place.

Nita Reddy
Nita Reddy (played by Gita Reddy) – An official that works at New York Governor Hutchison's office and was the first person to inform him of the riot. She took charge of efforts on behalf of the governor's office to quell the riot to include speaking to Taystee on the phone and in-person and arranged for the delivery of the care boxes given to the inmates that Taystee later burned on TV. After speaking to the governor, she was prepared to grant all of the demands of the inmates excluding the arrest and prosecution of Bayley, which was not under state jurisdiction. However, after Maria told her she broke the guards out herself so she could take advantage of MCC's furlough deal that was meant for Gloria she stood aside and let CERT breach the prison and informed the CERT leader that the governor gave authorization for casualties while clearing Freida's bunker. She also informed Maria that MCC did not have the authority to unilaterally grant inmates furlough, but she still gave her a chance to see Yadriel and Pepa when they showed up as a reward for releasing the guards.

Grace Warren
Grace Warren (played by Sarah Rish) – Suzanne's adoptive sister, and the biological daughter of Suzanne's adoptive parents. She was born when Suzanne was five years old and is shown allowing her to participate in parties with her friends. When Grace is 23, she lives in an apartment with her boyfriend Brad and Suzanne, and always spends the weekends home with her due to Suzanne being afraid to be home alone. She is happy when she hears that Suzanne was named the employee of the month at her job, and then lets her know that she and Brad decided to spend a weekend away. After reassuring her that she would be fine and giving Suzanne a list of things to do while they are gone, they leave for the weekend, not knowing what Suzanne would eventually end up doing while she was gone.

Wes Driscoll
Wes Driscoll (played by Charlie Barnett) – An inmate at the unidentified male prison where Piscatella was employed at the start of his career. While searching through Piscatella's office, Red finds his inmate name tag, and wonders who he is. In flashbacks, it is revealed that, after some initial flirtation, he and Piscatella began a secret relationship over some time. The two reportedly even got their initials tattooed on their wrists. However, after being witnessed in the middle of a private tryst, Wes was brutally beaten and raped by a group of inmates. Piscatella managed to fight them off, but it is left unclear whether Wes survived the attack. In his anger, Piscatella later murdered the leader of the group that attacked him, Miguel Resado.

Miguel Resado
Miguel Resado (played by Marcos Palma) – Another inmate at Piscatella's first prison. After finding Piscatella's file in Caputo's office, Flores discovers a report detailing how an inmate named Resado had been found unresponsive in the showers with 3rd-degree burns on 80% of his body, while on Piscatella's watch. A shocked Red realizes that Piscatella almost certainly killed him. In flashbacks, it is revealed that Resado was an inmate who while assigned to the kitchen accidentally walked in on Piscatella kissing Wes Driscoll, his secret lover. Subsequently, Resado had led a gang of other inmates in a brutal attack and gang rape of Driscoll. Enraged and vengeful, Piscatella had chained Resado under a shower and turned the hot water on full. When another guard starts to express concern at the sound of Resado's agonized screams, Piscatella coldly denies being able to hear anything and proceeds to stand guard as the flailing and screaming Resado is slowly boiled alive.
 The manner and circumstances of Resado's death and its aftermath are likely a reference to the death of Darren Rainey.

Main Officer Herrmann
Main Officer Herrmann (played by Jason Altman)  – The leader of the Correctional Emergency Response Team that stormed Litchfield to end the riot at the conclusion of the fifth season. Prior to the team breaching Freida's bunker to capture the remaining inmates, one of his team members accidentally kills Piscatella by shooting him in the head at point-blank range with a non-lethal pepper bullet. At the beginning of the sixth season, to prevent his team from being blamed for Piscatella's death, Herrmann orders them to carry Piscatella's body into the bunker and arranges the area so it would appear that he was murdered by an inmate, to include shooting him in the head with the gun that Taystee threatened him with. He then instructs his team to request a presumably corrupt coroner named Andy Styvver to perform Piscatella's autopsy before going over the cover story with them. Caputo suspects that he had something to do with Piscatella's death and confronts him in the courthouse after Taystee's guilty verdict, but Herrmann hits him and flees the area.

Natoli
Natoli (played by Josh Green)  – One of the members of the Correctional Emergency Response Team lead by Herrmann. While CERT was clearing the prison at the end of the fifth season, Herrmann scolded him after he aimed his weapon directly at an inmate due to the potential of the non-lethal rounds being fatal at close range, and he was instructed to aim at the ceiling instead. Prior to his team breaching Frieda's bunker, he accidentally shot Piscatella in the head with a pepper round which killed him instantly. He was shocked and upset over his mistake, but he didn't take responsibility for the killing due to Herrmann instructing the team to take Piscatella's body into the bunker and make the shooting look like an inmate murdered him.

Debbie Denning

Debbie Denning (played by Ripley Sobo)  – The younger sister of inmates Barbara and Carol Denning. A talented gymnast, she received most of the attention from her parents, which caused her older sisters to secretly despise her. Due to her talents, her family is moving to Texas for an advanced gymnastics program. On what was supposed to be their last day in town, she asks her sisters to drive her to a nearby lake so she can release her tadpoles. At the lake, she walks with Barb to release the tadpoles into the ice water, and while walking she tells Barb that she does not want to move. Following this, Carol runs towards them screaming with a hatchet in her hand and Debbie jumps into the car, not knowing that the locks were removed. Trapped in the car, she begs her sisters to stop while they push the car into the lake.
 The actress for younger Carol, Ashley Jordyn, stated on a Reddit Ask Me Anything that Debbie died.

Wyndolyn Capers
Wyndolyn Capers (played by Alysia Joy Powell) – Piper's probation officer. She first appears in the seventh season taking urine samples from Piper. She conducts a surprise visit at Piper's apartment when she finds out Piper was fired from the Thai restaurant and threatens to have her arrested if she doesn't find a new job, which results in the other women present in the apartment at the time fleeing while they were talking. After Piper eats a “Bloob” Cal gave her and fails to mask her urine, she orders Piper to attend ten NA meetings at a halfway house instead of sending her back to jail. At one of Piper's final meetings with her, it is revealed Wyndolyn is also Sophia's probation officer when Sophia checks in with her while Piper is still there.

Zelda

Zelda (played by Alicia Witt) – A love interest for Piper after she gets released from prison. She first appears during a retreat in the forest with several other women to include Piper, and she quickly gains a connection with her. She agrees to go with Piper to dinner with Larry and Polly so she is not alone with them. After the dinner, Zelda invites Piper to a benefit for Syrian children run by the Karam Foundation. At the benefit, she gives a speech while Piper introduces herself to some of her friends attending. While she was outside of Piper's apartment, she tries to get Piper to invite her in so they can become intimate, but Piper rejects her out of respect for Alex before receiving a surprise visit from McCollough claiming that she and Alex were in a relationship. After McCollough's visit, Piper goes to Zelda's apartment and they begin having sex. Near the end of the season, Zelda returns to Piper's apartment and meets her father, whom she told she was going on a consulting trip in Northampton for a few weeks. She asks Piper to come with her and then gives her a poppy seed bagel to celebrate the end of her probation. When Piper initially hesitates, Zelda asks her to think it over, something that Piper's father reiterated, but she still ended up declining.

Elmer Fantauzzo

Elmer Fantauzzo (played by Mike Cabellon)  – A teacher that prepared the inmates for the GED exam. He was able to convince a skeptical Tiffany to stay for his GED class and hold the attention of the other inmates with his unique method of teaching. After Tiffany failed the first practice test despite cheating off of her partner due to her misspelled words, the teacher concluded that she may have dyslexia. Elmer tells her that he will talk to the warden about giving Tiffany extra time and encouraged her to get tutoring to prepare. However, after Daya and her crew try to force him to smuggle drugs into the prison by threatening him and his son he quits and flees the state.

See also
 List of Orange Is the New Black characters

References

Recurring
Lists of American comedy-drama television series characters
Lists of American crime television series characters
Lists of minor fictional characters